= Antoniny Palace =

Former hunting lodge of the Sanguszko and Potocki families in Antoniny, Ukraine

Coordinates: 49°48′31″N 26°52′16″E

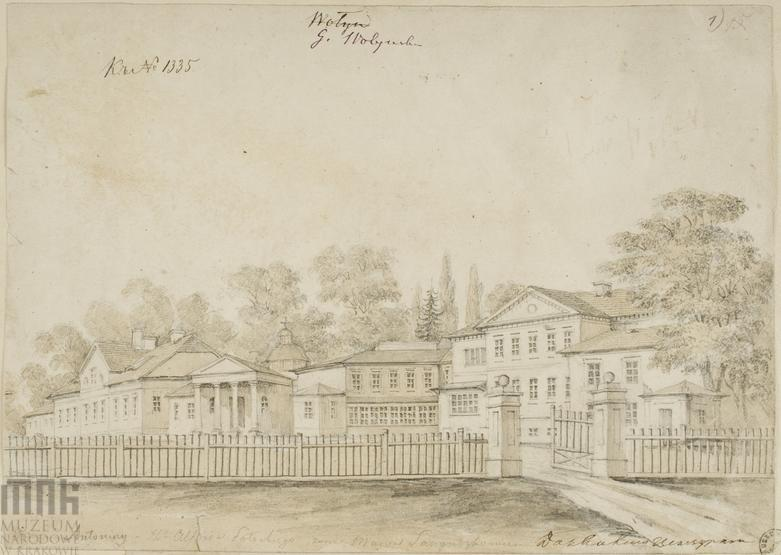
- Antoniny Palace before the reconstruction into a neo-baroque stately home
- Interactive map of Antoniny Palace

Immovable Monument of National Significance of Ukraine
- Official name: Садиба (Manor)
- Type: Architecture
- Reference no.: 220033

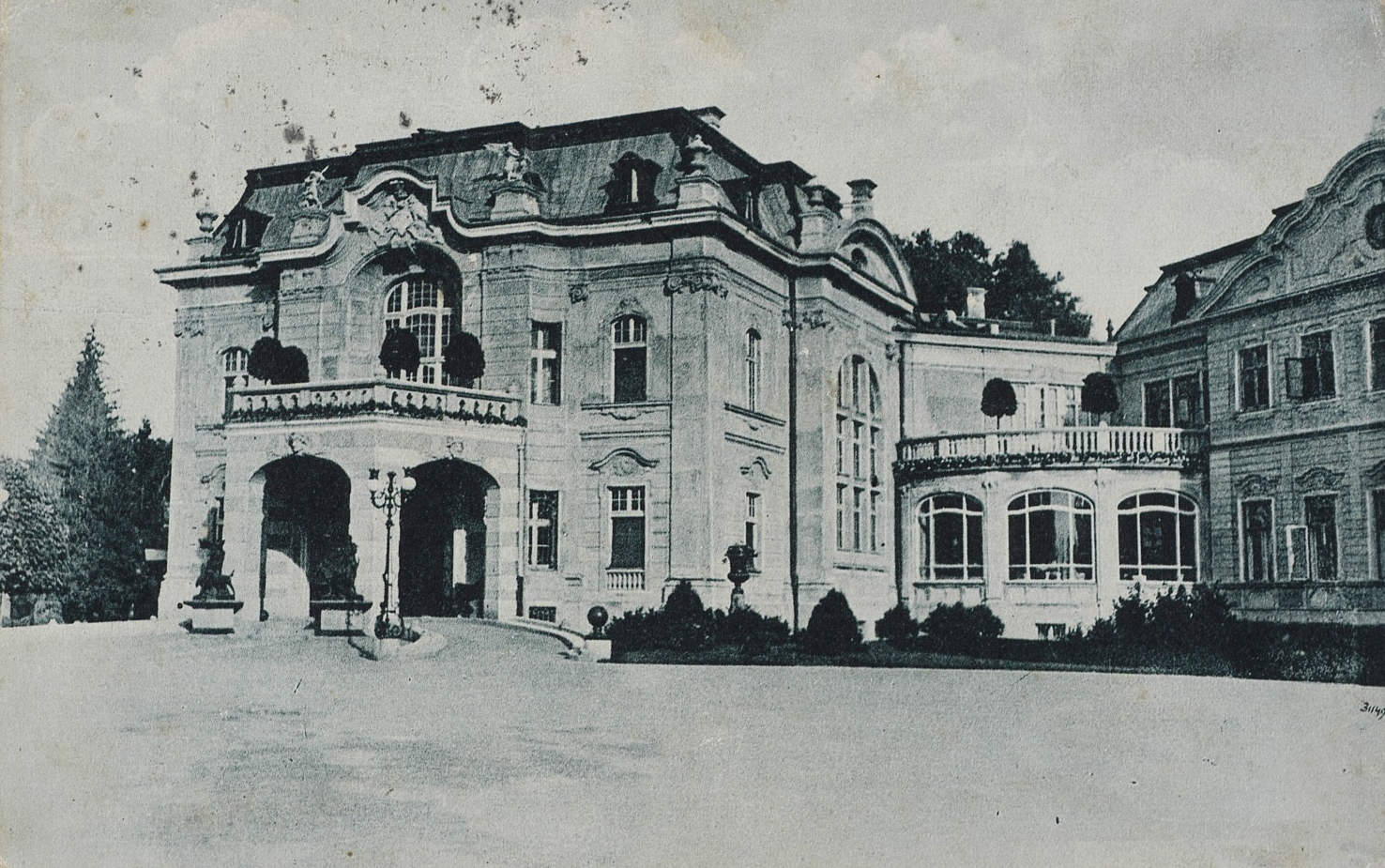
Antoniny Palace in 1914

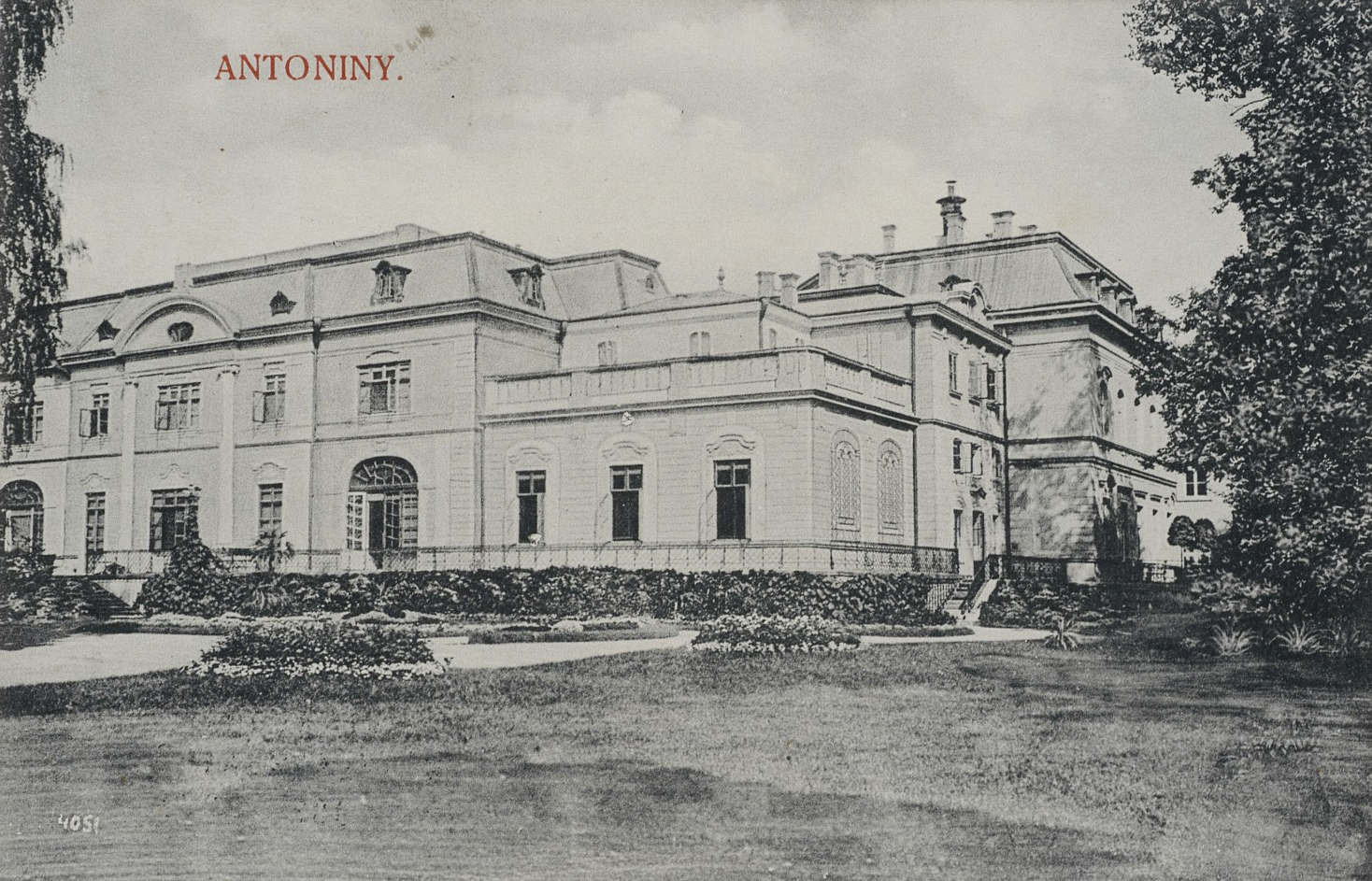
Antoniny Palace in 1910

Antoniny Palace (Ukrainian: Антонінський палац) was a palace of the noble Sanguszko and Potocki families in Antoniny, Ukraine. It was destroyed during the Russian Civil War in August 1919. Today the park and various service buildings remain, such as the stables.

== History ==
In the 1760s, Barbara Sanguszko (1718–1791), grants for long-term use the village and estate of Holodky to Ignatius Malchevsky, who was married to her sister Antonina, and was regent of the royal chancellery. The couple settled in Holodky, and decided to construct a palace and a garden. Ignatius named the palace after his beloved wife Antonina. The name also became associated with the village, so Holodky became Antoniny.

At the start of the 19th century, the castle returned to the Sanguszko family, who further renovated the palace and turned into a splendid estate. When Maria Klementyna Sanguszko (1830–1903) married Alfred Józef Potocki (1822–1889), Antoniny palace transferred to the Potocki family. When her husband died, she transferred the palace to her younger son, Józef Mikołaj Potocki (1862–1922). The elder son, Roman Potocki, inherited Łańcut Castle.

Józef Potocki was one of the richest magnates in the Russian empire, a lover of nature and an avid hunter. He travelled the world around for it, not only Poland, but also India, Ceylon and Africa. This was also reflected in Antoniny, which was rebuilt into a neo-baroque residence. The reconstruction happened in various phases: the Austrian architects Fellner & Helmer did the first work in the 1870s. The French architect François Arveuf was involved between 1897 and 1903 adding a guest wing and redesigning the interior. And Ferdinand Fellner again between 1905 and 1908, adding a new entrance.

The new renovated palace was full of elegance and luxury. It became famous for its stud of Arabian horses, and its cellars having the most exotic liquors. The reception halls were decorated with hunting trophies. Also, the palace room housed a large art collection, consisting of paintings, porcelain (e.g. Sèvres, Saxon and Korets) and books. Józef gathered in his library around 20,000 volumes. The garden and park around the palace were around six thousand hectares in size. Józef arranged here one of the largest menagerie parks of Europe, where he arranged many hunts but also bred animals that were not used to the European climate.

During the first World War, the palace was guarded by clerks and administrators. But it did not help, in the Russian Civil war which followed, the Bolsheviks set the palace on fire. It lasted several days in August 1919, and destroyed the entire mansion. During the fire, employees and some residents of the estate moved part of the collections (artworks, furniture, library and archive) to nearby stables and campers. In 1920, they were transported to Warsaw. The transferred collections were destroyed during the Warsaw Uprising in 1944.

In the 1960s, a sport stadium was constructed on the site of the palace. What now today remains, are only the landscape park and some ancillary buildings, such as the stables. The entrance gates still bear the coat of arms of the Sanguszko and Potocki families.

== Gallery ==
=== The palace in its heyday ===
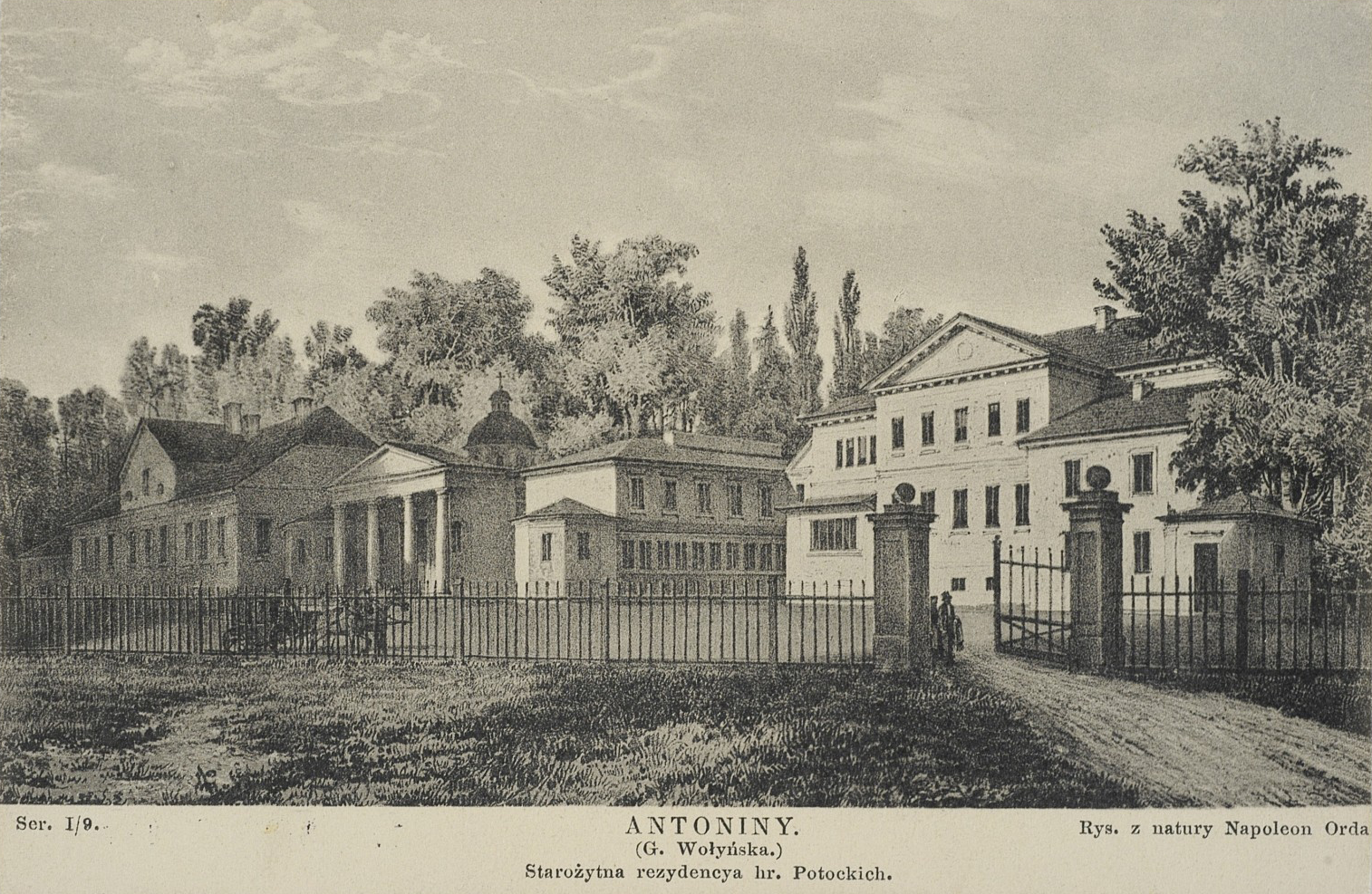
The palace in the 19th century

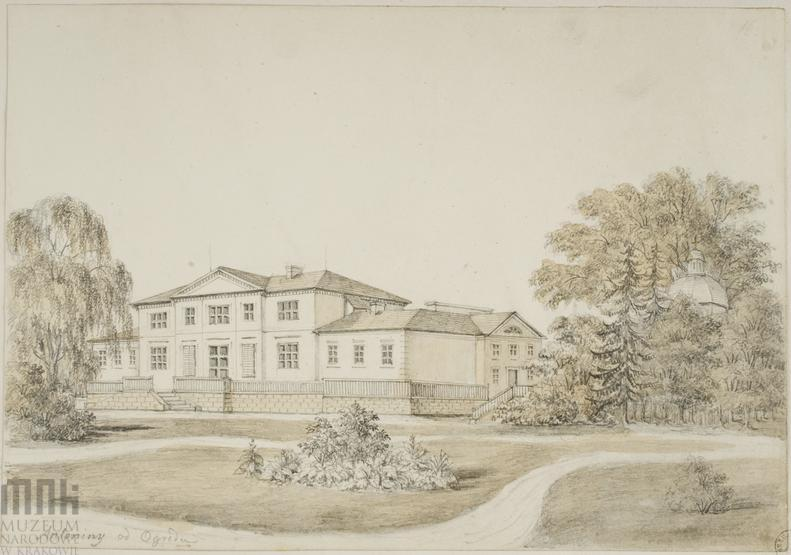
The palace before the neo-baroque rebuilding

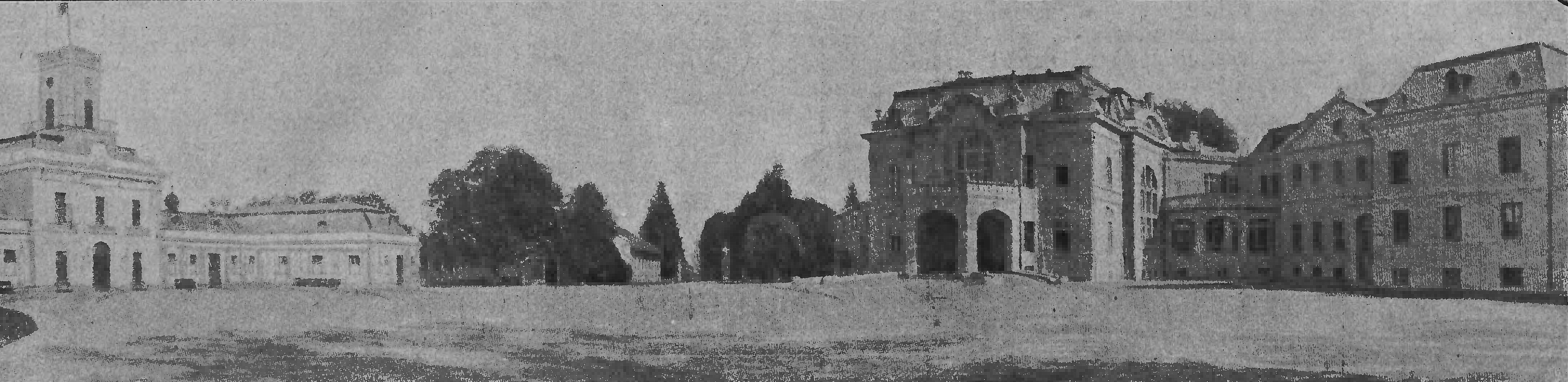
The palace and its stables opposite

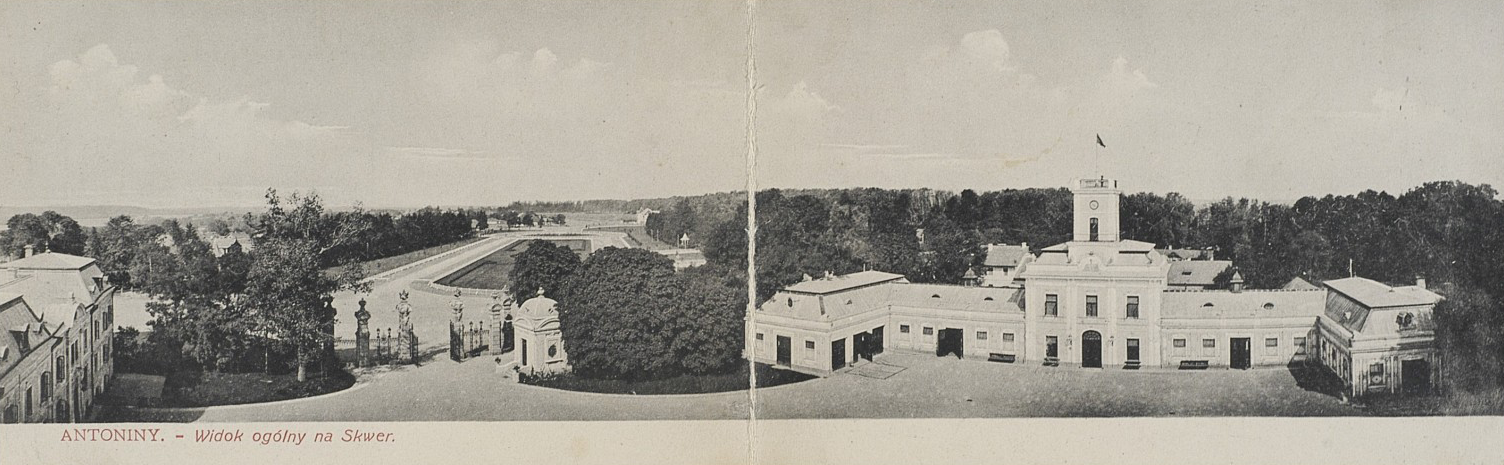
A view of the stables and the gates in 1912

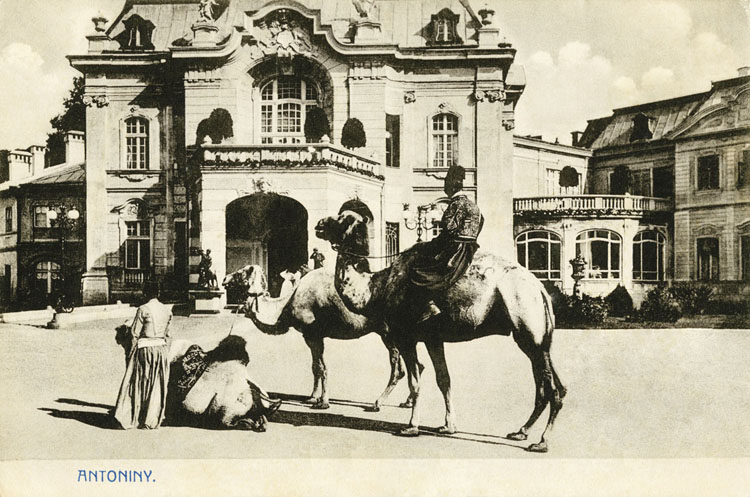
Camels at the palace

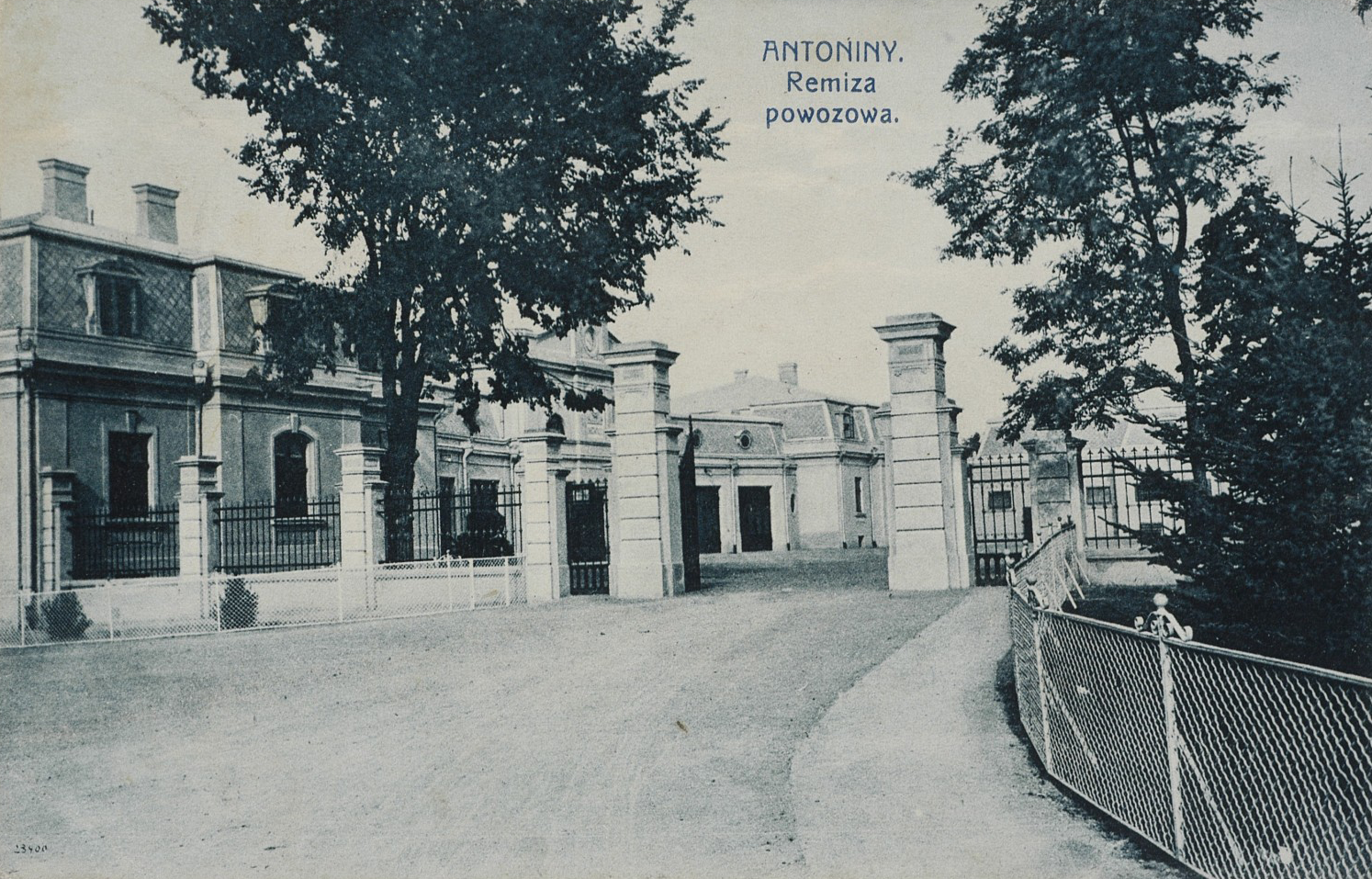
Entrance to the palace in 1916

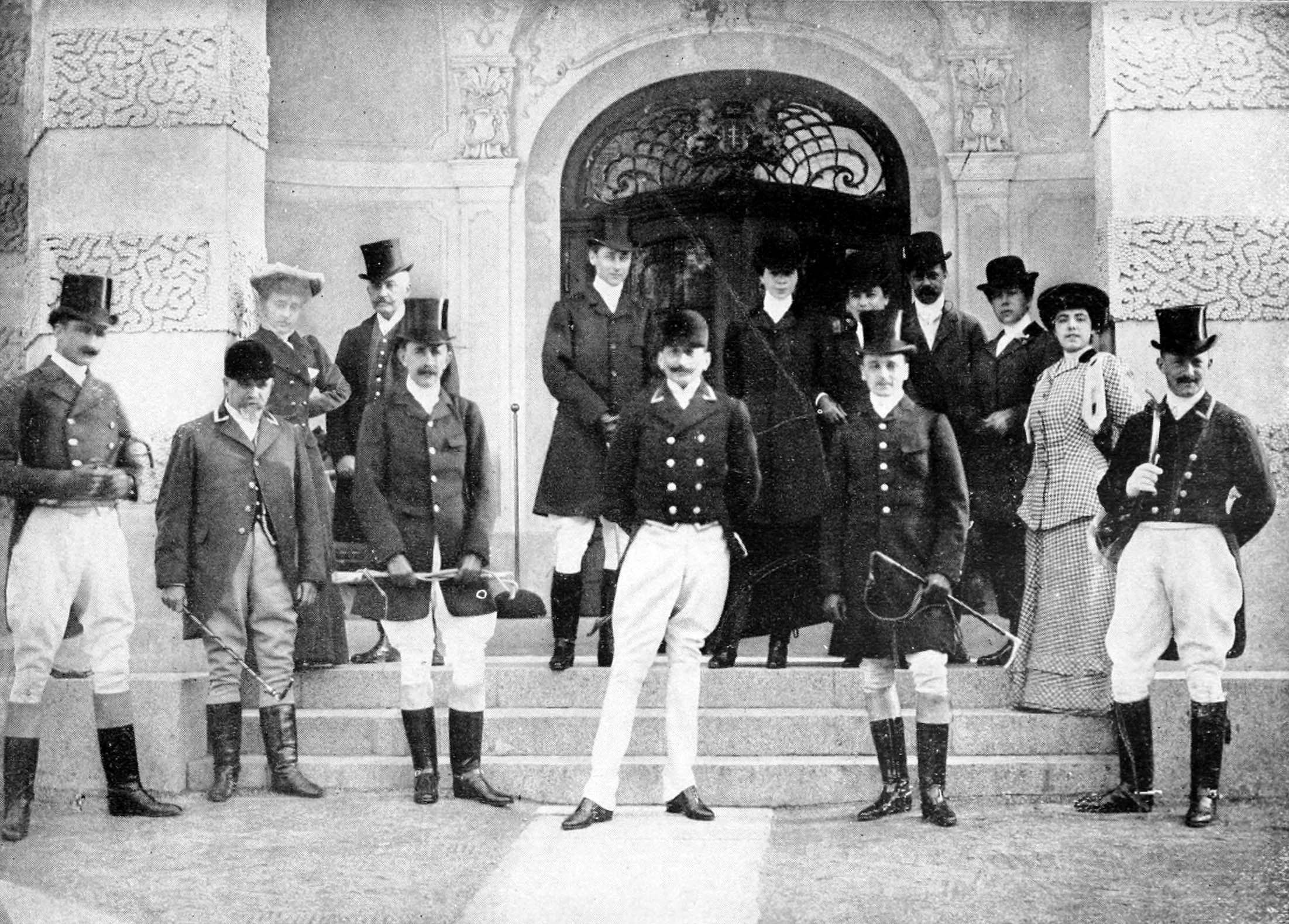
A hunting party at the steps of the palace

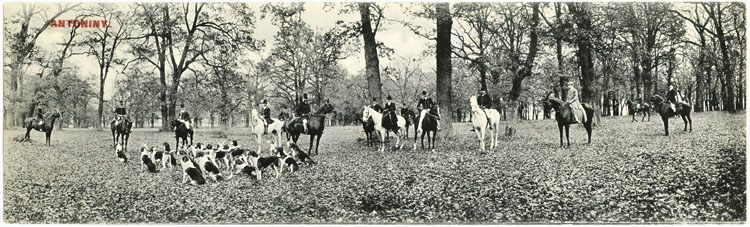
A hunt at the Antoniny estate

=== What has remained ===
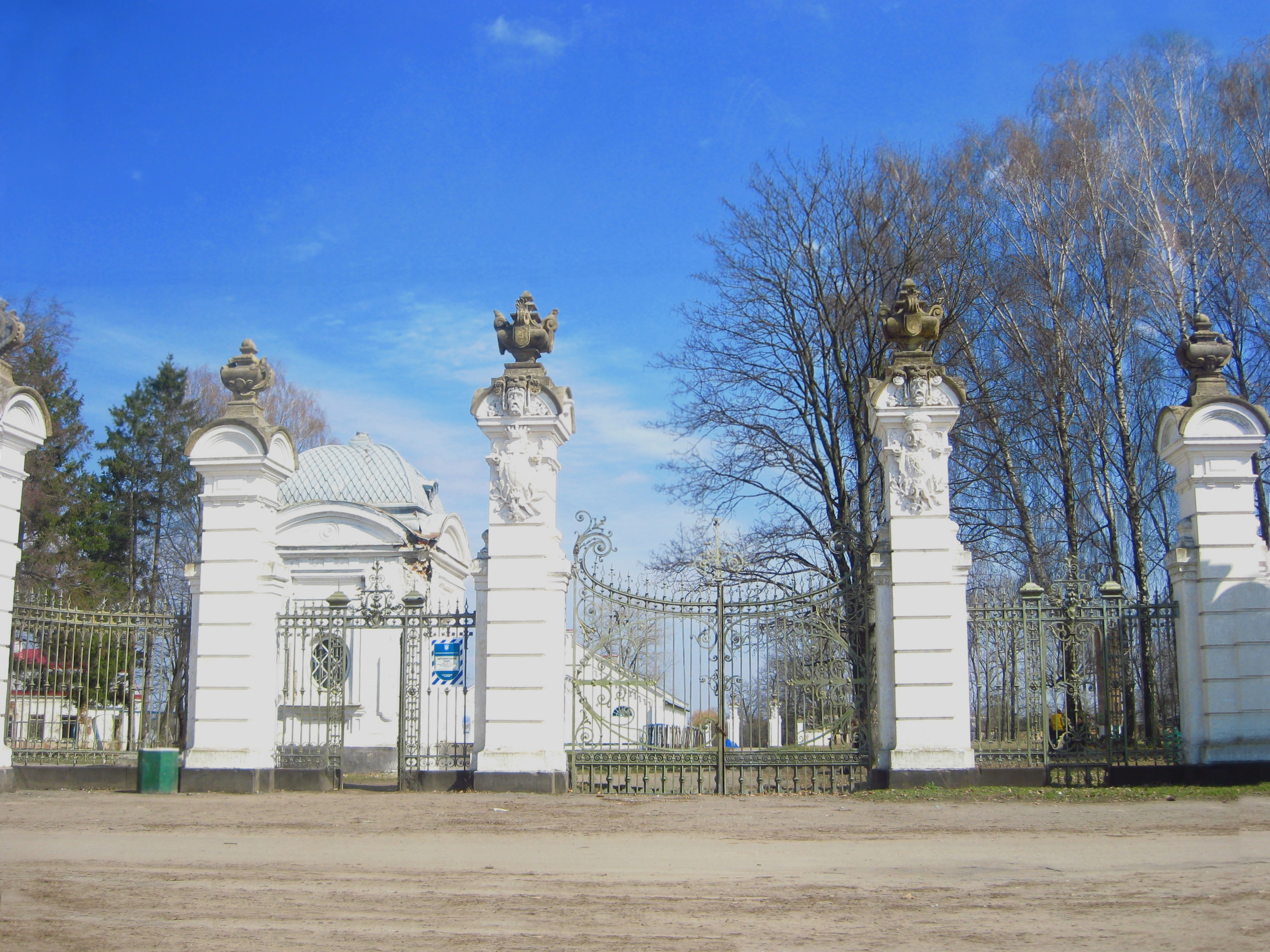
The palace gates with the coat of arms of the Sanguszko and Potocki families

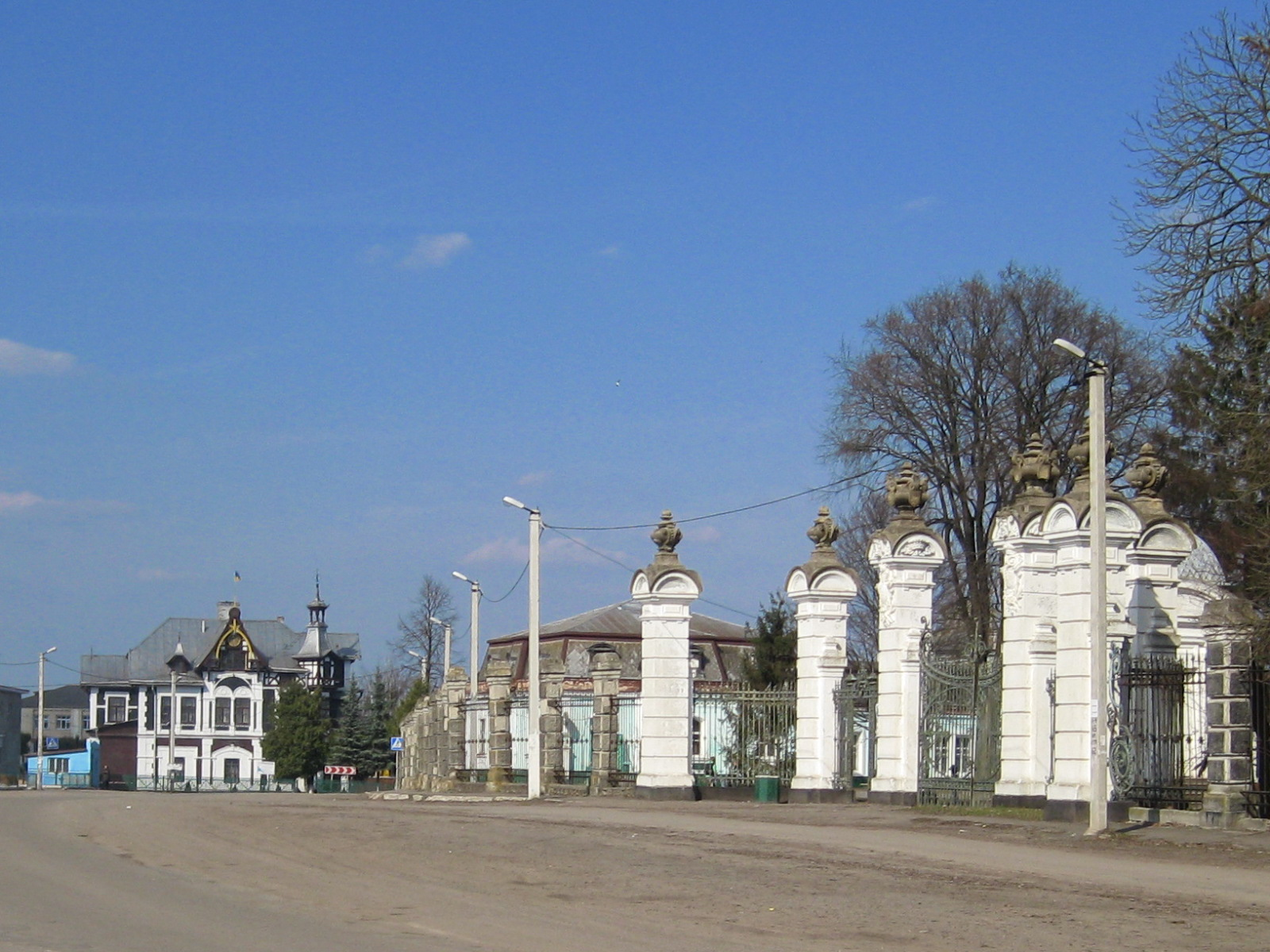
Another view of the palace gates

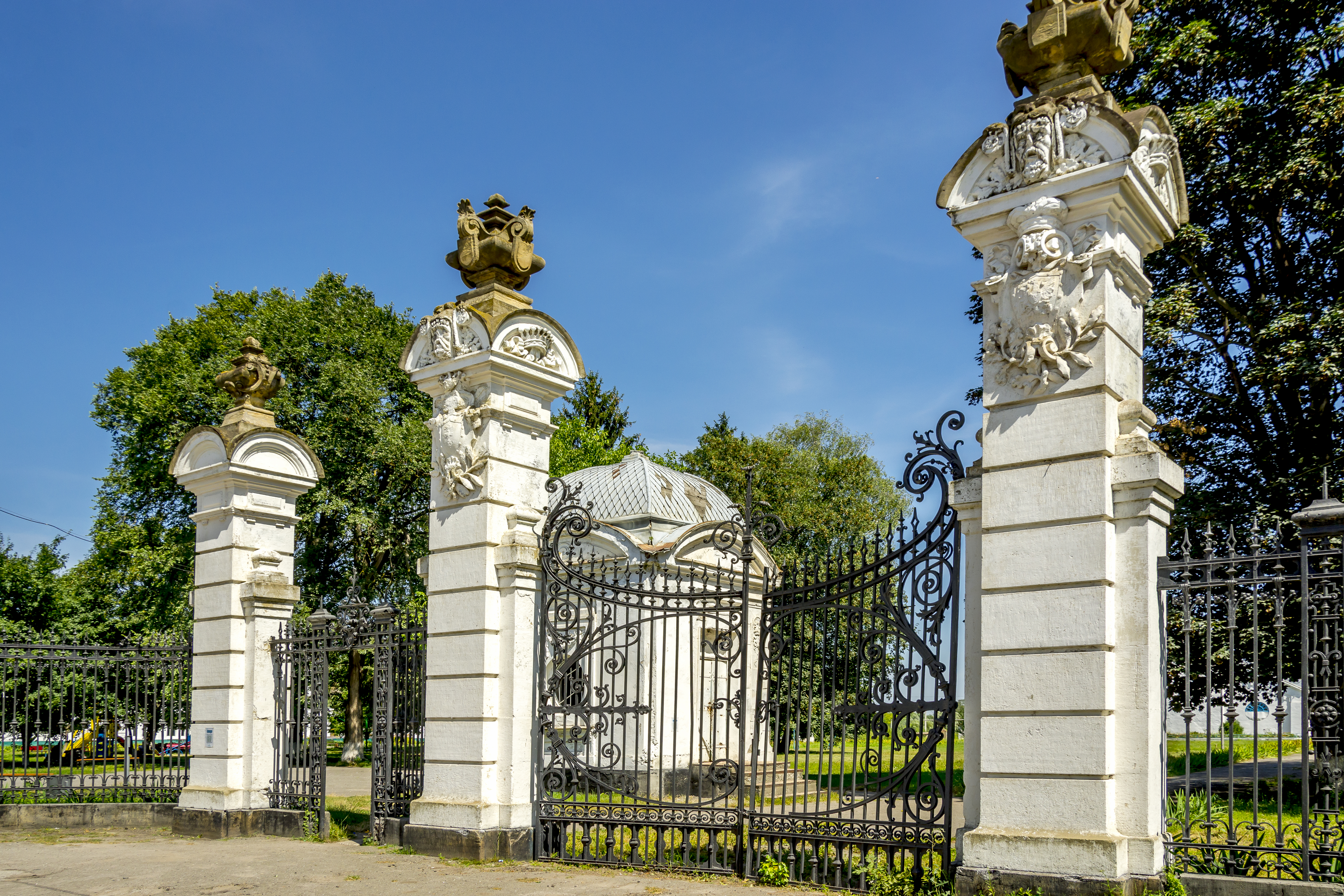
Another view of the palace gates

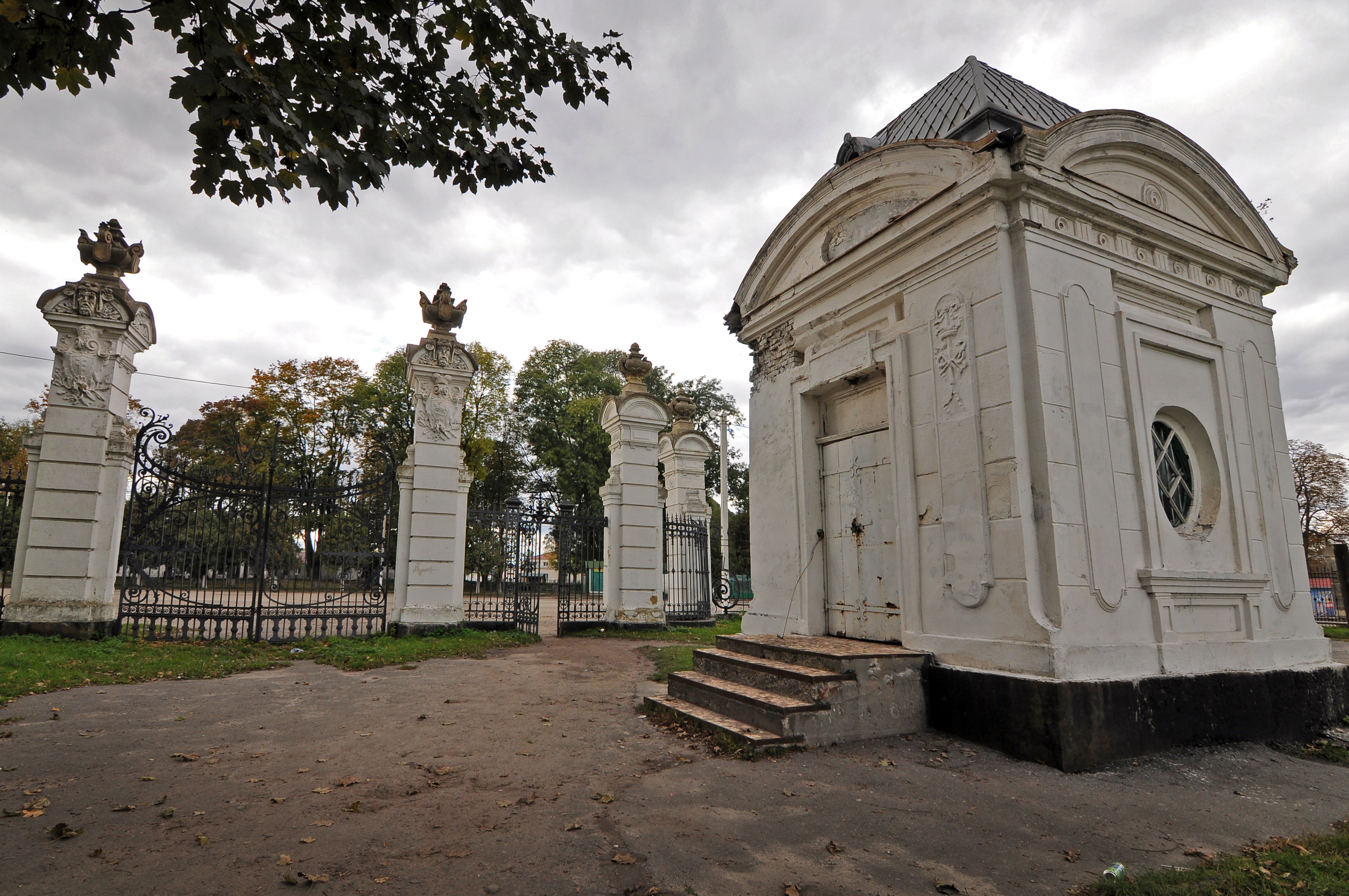
A dilapidated guardhouse

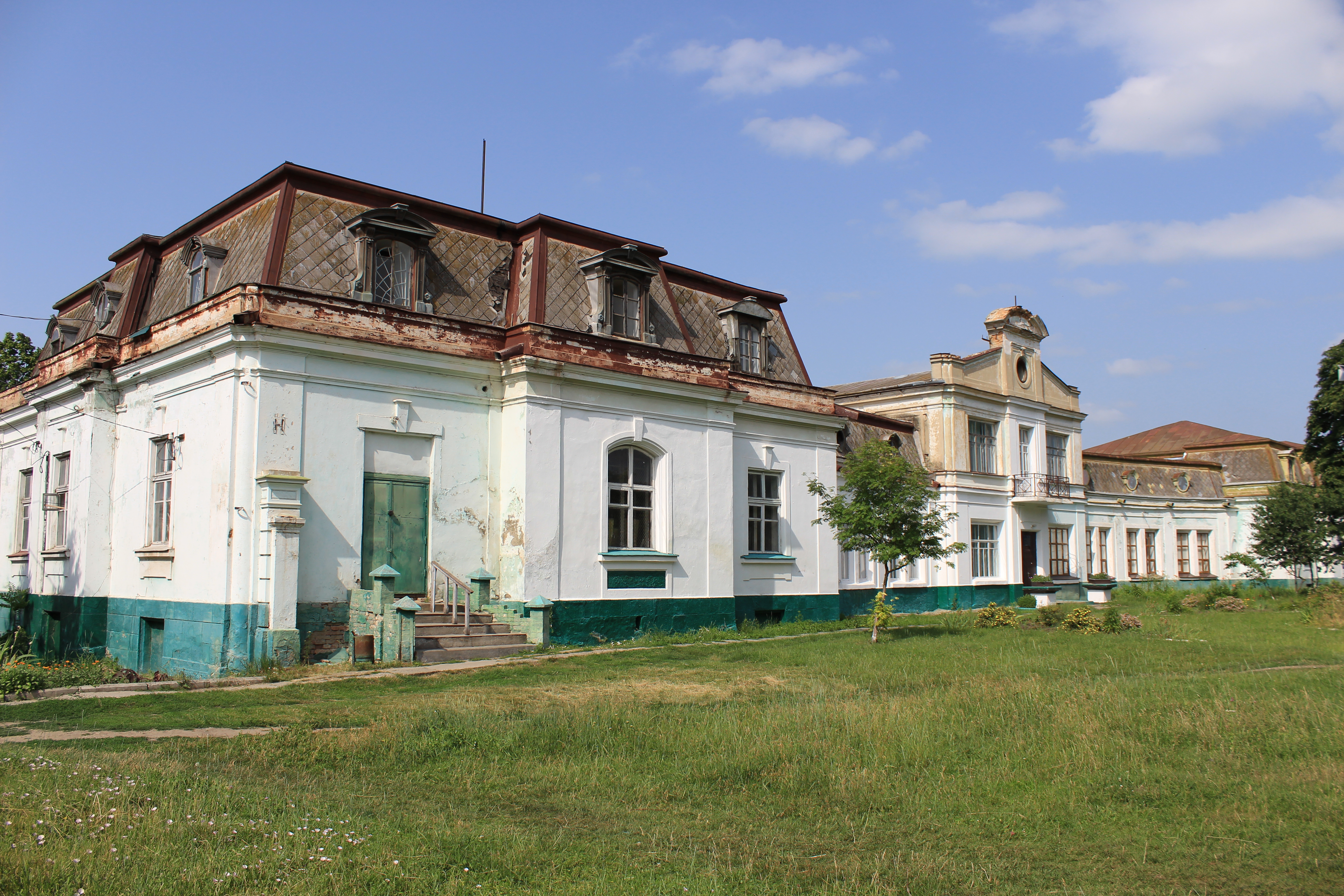
A former service building

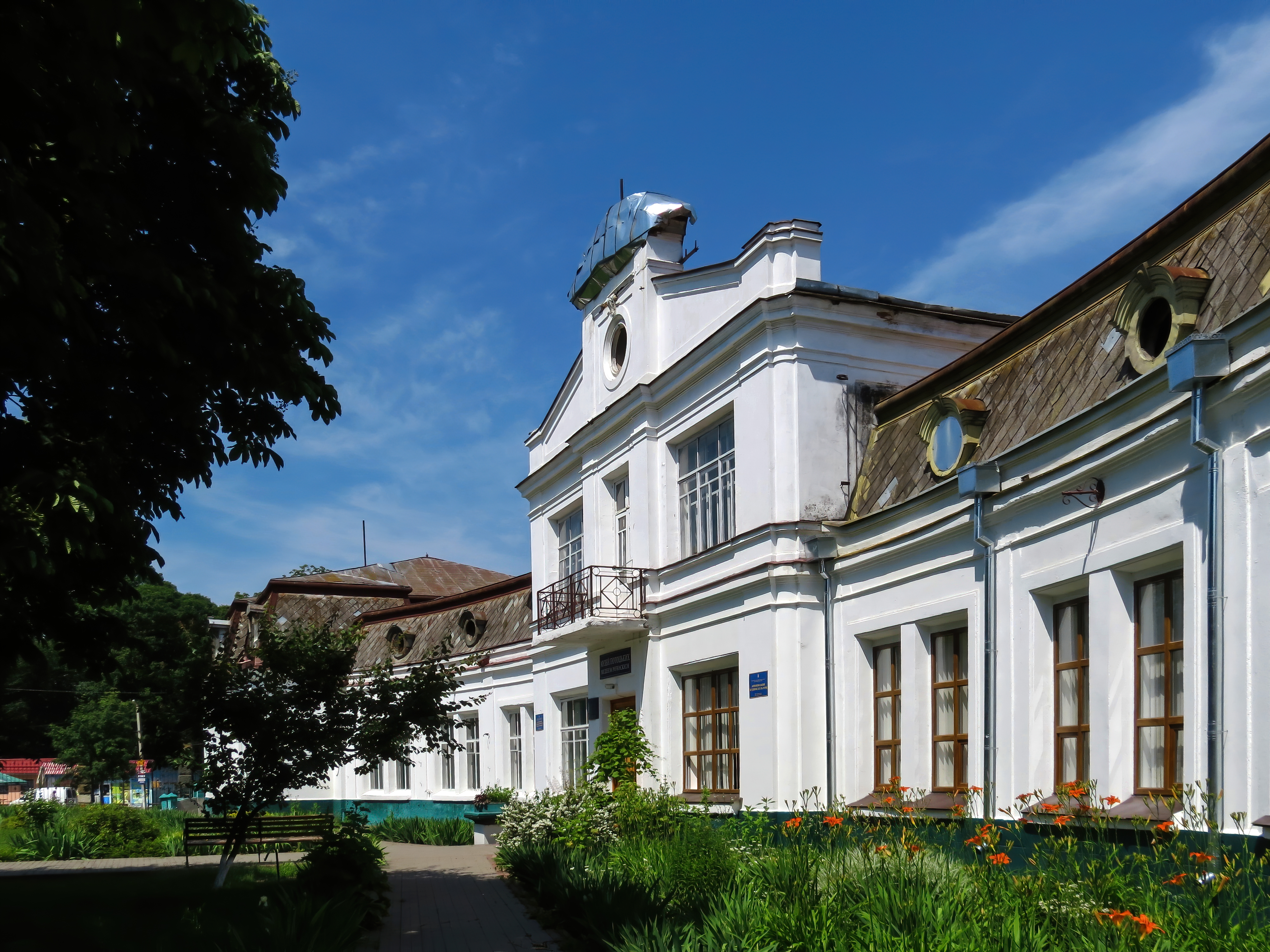
A former service building

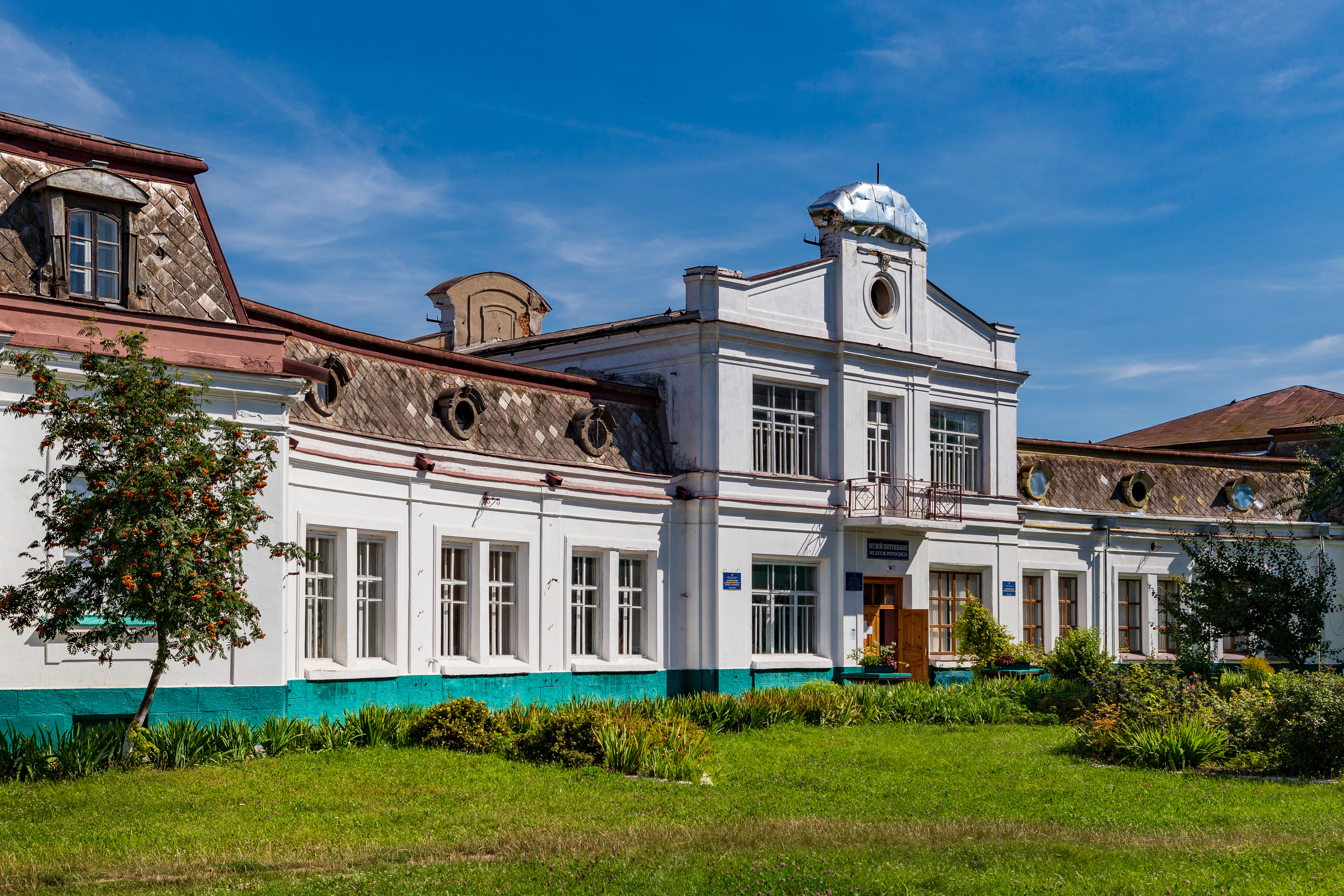
A former service building

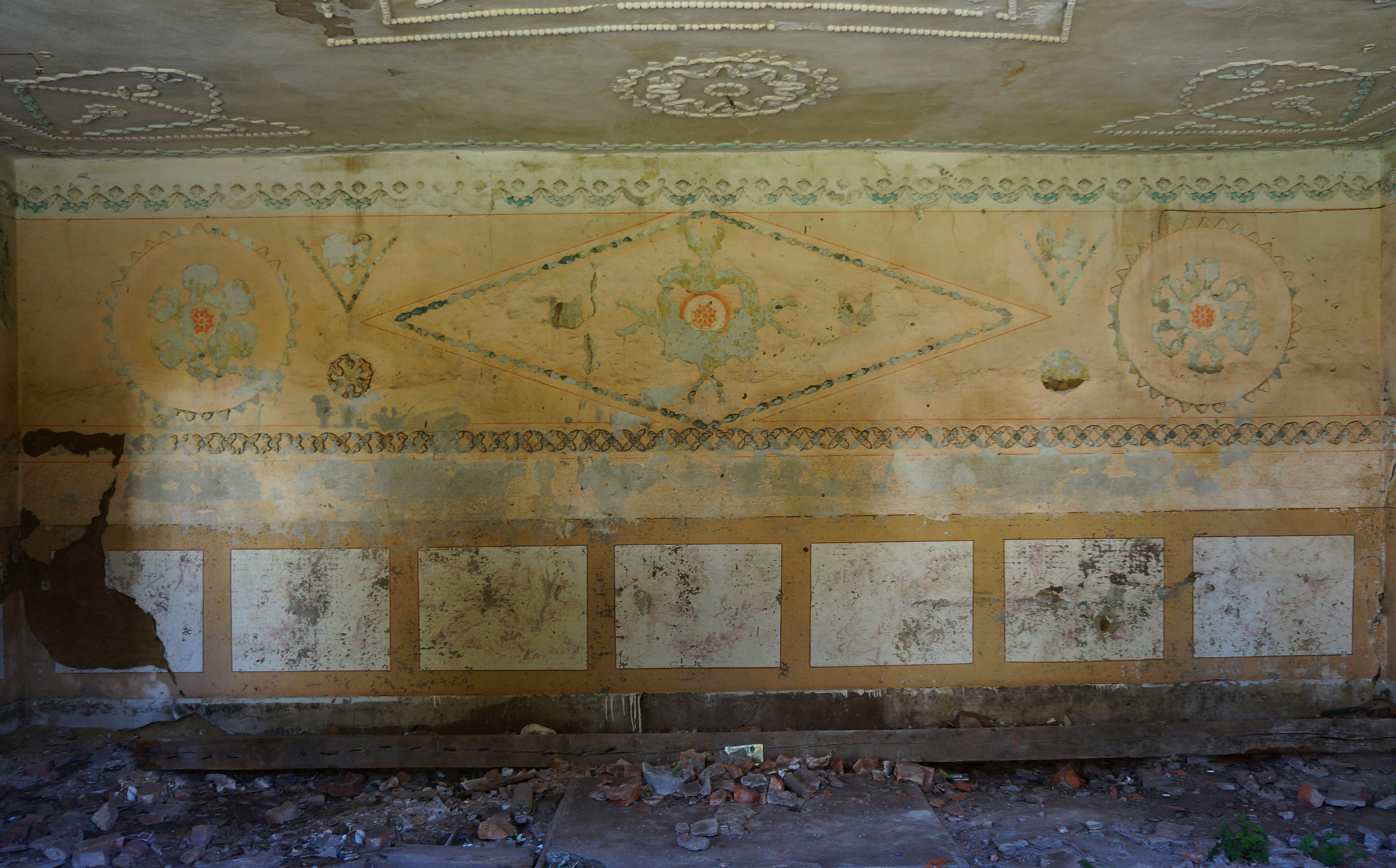
Remains of the interior in a service building
