= Jerzy Józef Henryk Potocki =

Polish politician (1889-1961)

Count Jerzy Józef Henryk Potocki
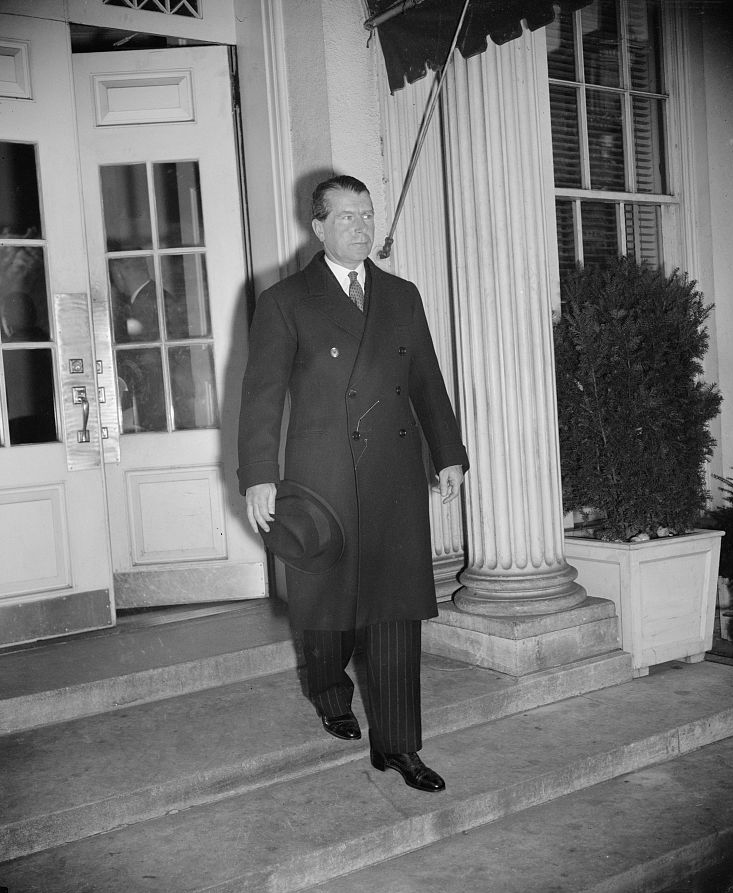
- Potocki leaving the White House after thanking Pres. Roosevelt for assistance the U.S. gave to Poland, 16 November 1939
- Coat of arms: Piława
- Born: 29 January 1889; Vienna, Austria-Hungary
- Died: 20 September 1961 (aged 72); Geneva, Switzerland
- Family: Potocki
- Father: Count Roman Potocki
- Mother: Princess Elżbieta Matylda Radziwiłł

Count Jerzy Józef Henryk Potocki (29 January 1889 – 10 September 1961) was a Polish nobleman, captain of the cavalry and diplomat. (Note that the Almanach błękitny gives his name as Jerzy Antoni Potocki)

== Early life ==
His parents were Roman Potocki, Third Ordynat of Łańcut, and Elżbieta Matylda Radziwiłł. His elder brother was Count Alfred Antoni Potocki.

His paternal grandparents were Count Alfred Józef Potocki, the Minister-President of Austria, and Princess Maria Klementyna Sanguszko. He was also a great-great-grandson of Jan Potocki. His maternal grandparents were Prince Antoni Wilhelm Radziwiłł and Marie de Castellane (the daughter of French aristocrats Henri de Castellane and Pauline de Talleyrand-Périgord). His paternal uncle, Count Józef Mikołaj Potocki, married his maternal aunt, Princess Helena Augusta Radziwiłł.

== Career ==
On 8 January 1919 he joined the Polish Army after the dissolution of the Austro-Hungarian Empire and Army, was assigned to the General Staff and appointed military attaché in Budapest.

Since 1933 in the diplomatic service, he was appointed ambassador to Italy but refused to take the commission in protest against the Four-Power Pact. From 1933 to 1936 he was ambassador in Ankara and from 1936 to 1940 in Washington.

== Personal life ==
On 28 June 1931, he married Peruvian born Susanita de Iturregui y Orbegoso (b. 1899) in Paris. Together, they were the parents of:

- Count Stanisław Potocki (1932–2014), who married in 1997 Rosa Susanna Lacro de la Fuente (b. 1927)

Count Potocki died on 10 September 1961 in Geneva, Switzerland.
