= Roman Potocki =

Polish nobleman and politician (1852–1915)

Count Roman Potocki
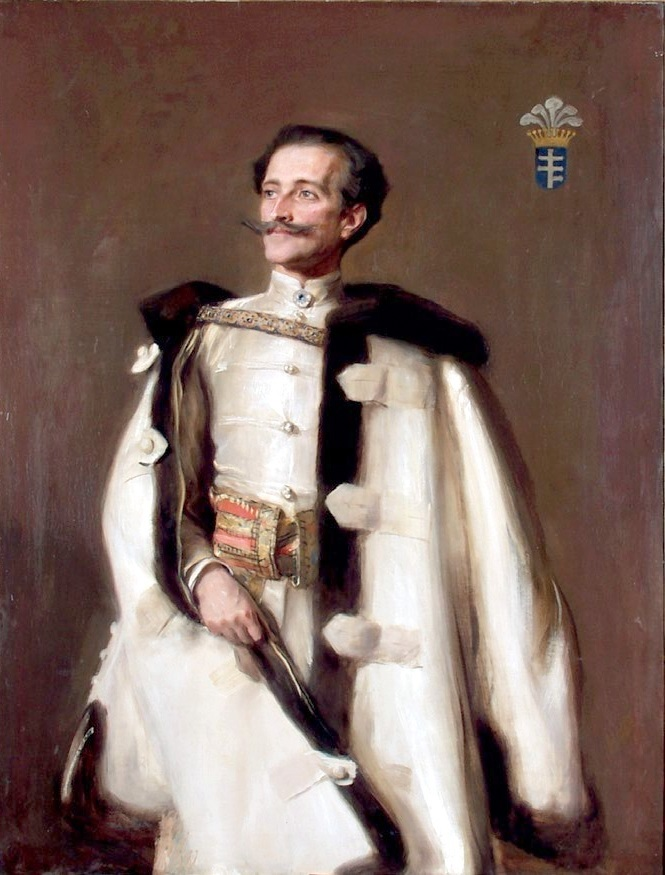
- Portrait by Teodor Axentowicz, 1898
- Born: 16 December 1852; Łańcut, Kingdom of Galicia and Lodomeria, Austrian Empire
- Died: 24 September 1915 (aged 62); Łańcut, Kingdom of Galicia and Lodomeria, Austria-Hungary
- Noble family: Potocki
- Spouses: Countess Izabella Potocka (m. 1882; died 1883) Princess Elżbieta Matylda Radziwiłł (m. 1885)
- Issue: Count Alfred Antoni Potocki; Count Jerzy Józef Henryk Potocki
- Father: Count Alfred Józef Potocki
- Mother: Princess Maria Klementyna Sanguszko

Count Roman Potocki (16 December 1852 – 24 September 1915) was a Polish nobleman (szlachcic) and politician.

== Early life ==
Count Roman was born on 16 December 1852 at Łańcut in the Kingdom of Galicia and Lodomeria, in what was then a part of the Austrian Empire. He was a son of Count Alfred Józef Potocki, Minister-President of Austria, and Princess Maria Klementyna Sanguszko. His brother, Count Józef Mikołaj Potocki, married his second wife's younger sister, Princess Helena Augusta Radziwiłł.

His paternal grandparents were Count Alfred Wojciech Potocki (the son of writer Jan Potocki, best known for his famous novel "The Manuscript Found in Saragossa") and Princess Józefina Maria Czartoryska. His maternal grandparents were Prince Roman Sanguszko and Countess Natalia Potocka.

== Career ==
He ran a family distillery, which is today known as Polmos Łańcut. Following his father's death, he became Third Lord Ordynat of Łańcut estates (which his father had inherited from his father).

He was a member of the Polish Circle in the Council of State for Austria-Hungary and served in the Diet of Galicia and Lodomeria, was a member of Austrian Imperial Council from 1882 to 1890, and was a Member of the Austrian House of Lords in 1890.

Awarded with the Order of the Golden Fleece.

== Personal life ==
On 21 November 1882, he married Countess Izabella Potocka in Warsaw. She was a daughter of Count Stanislaw Potocki and Princess Maria Sapieha-Kodenska. She died in Vienna on 21 March 1883.

On 16 June 1885, he married Princess Elżbieta Matylda Radziwiłł (1861–1950) in Berlin. She was a daughter of Prince Antoni Wilhelm Radziwiłł and Marie de Castellane (the daughter of French aristocrats Henri de Castellane and Pauline de Talleyrand-Périgord). Before their divorce, they had two children:

- Count Alfred Antoni Potocki (1886–1958), who married Izadora Narkiewicz-Jodko, a daughter of Zygmunt Narkiewicz-Jodko and Stanislawa Jordan-Walawska in 1956.
- Count Jerzy Józef Potocki (1889–1961), the Polish ambassador to the United States from 1936 to 1940 who married Susanita Yturregui in 1931.

Count Potocki died in Łańcut on 24 September 1915, in what by then had become Austria-Hungary.
