= Roman Sanguszko =

Russian and Polish nobleman and officer

Prince Roman Sanguszko
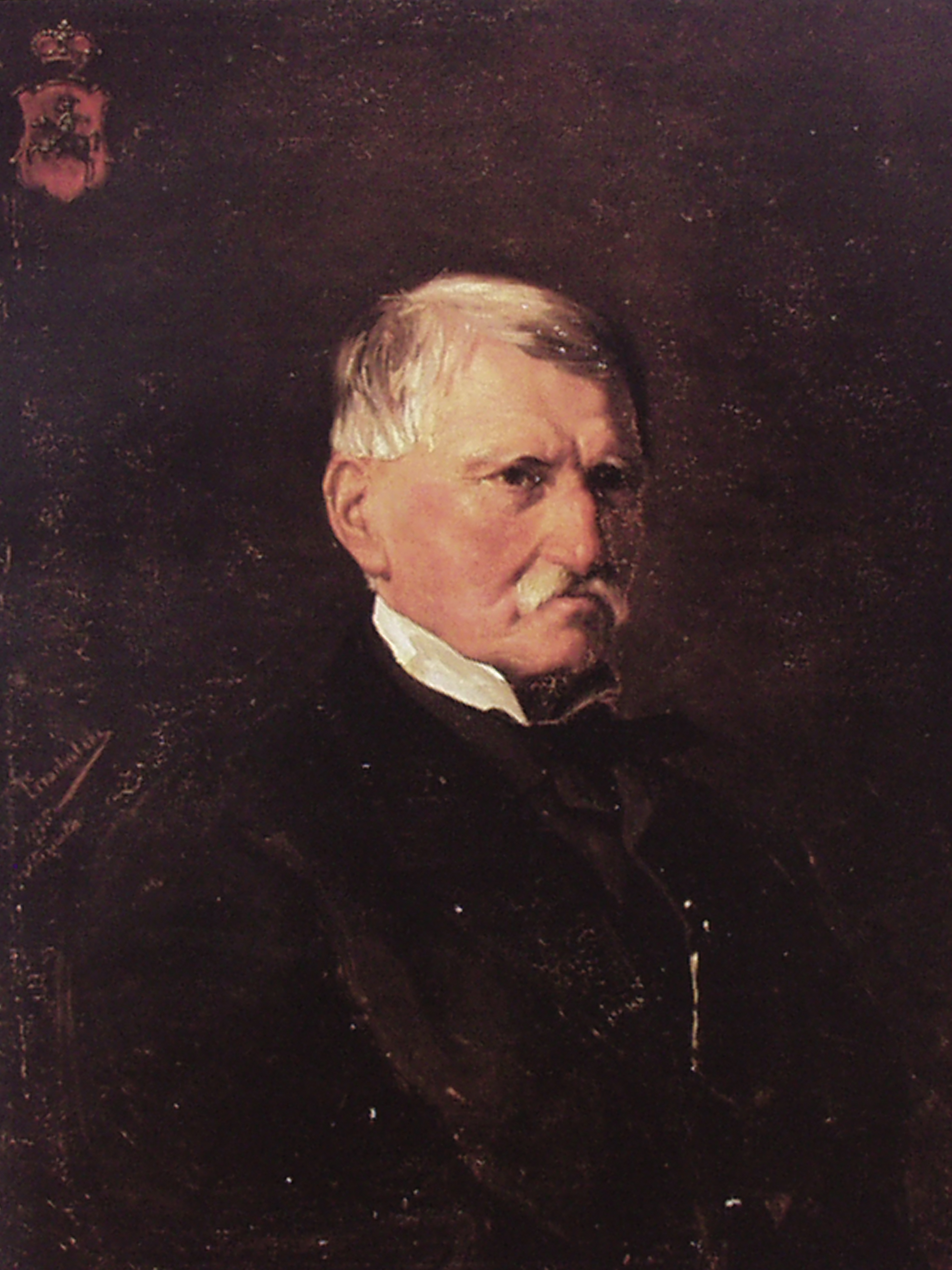
- Prince Roman the Siberian
- Coat of arms: Pogoń Litewska
- Born: 6 May 1800; Antoniny, Russian Empire
- Died: 26 March 1881 (aged 80); Slavuta, Russian Empire
- Family: Sanguszko
- Spouse: Countess Natalia Potocka
- Issue: Princess Maria Klementyna Sanguszko
- Father: Prince Eustachy Erazm Sanguszko
- Mother: Princess Klementyna Czartoryska

Prince Roman Adam Stanisław Sanguszko (1800–1881) was a Polish aristocrat, patriot, political and social activist.

== Biography ==
Roman Sanguszko was born on 6 May 1800 in his family manor in Volhynia. The eldest of his kin, he was the heir of the fortune of the Kowel line of the Sanguszko family, one of the richest and most notable families of the former Polish–Lithuanian Commonwealth. Early in his youth he was forced to join the Russian Imperial Guard, as Tsar Alexander I of Russia demanded that all the heirs of aristocratic families be sent to Russian military schools to ensure their families' loyalty. However, after short service Sanguszko was allowed to return home due to poor health. He then moved to Berlin, where he graduated from the local university. On 14 May 1829 in Warsaw he married Natalia Potocka, a lady of the mighty Potocki family. Soon after giving birth to Maria Klementyna, Natalia died. Despaired Sanguszko decided to join the Capuchin friars, but changed his mind after the outbreak of the November Uprising against Russia.

Soon after leaving the convent he joined the Polish Army and served with distinction in several battles, most notably at Lubartów and Zamość. He quickly rose through the ranks and in 1831 he became an adjutant to General Jan Skrzynecki. For his acts of bravery he was awarded with the Virtuti Militari, but in June of that year he was taken prisoner by the Russians. Imprisoned in Kiev, he was tried for high treason, as the court regarded him a citizen of Russia rather than Commonwealth. It was suggested that he might be pardoned should he renounce his loyalty to the Commonwealth leaders of the uprising, but Sanguszko declined and the court sentenced him to loss of noble status, confiscation of all property (one of the largest fortunes in the region) and exile to Siberia. To avoid losing most of the property, he subscribed it to his daughter. On 18 December 1831 Sanguszko was compelled to walk the entire way to Siberia (about 3300 km) in chains for his part in the insurrection, as was usual at the time. It took him roughly 10 months to reach the area of Tobolsk through Orel, Moscow, Yaroslavl, Nizhny Novgorod, Kazan, Perm and Tyumen.

Soon after his arrival, he was drafted into the Russian Army and relocated to the Caucasus, where he was forced to fight against Shamil's Rebellion, a part of the half-a-century long Caucasian War. Deprived of his rights, he served as a private in the Tengin Regiment. He was wounded in the leg during one of the skirmishes and had an accident with a horse, which resulted in serious loss of hearing. For his bravery, he was again promoted to officer's grade and finally in 1845 allowed to return to his manor in Slavuta.

He left most of the property of his family in hands of his daughter and instead focused on economical development of Slavuta. Sanguszko started several businesses and with time his land became one of the most industrialized properties in the area. Apart from the textile plant (with a branch in Tarnów), he also founded a sugar plant, paper factory, steel mill and a lumber-mill. He also created a large horse farm specializing in the breeding of racehorses. Finally, he significantly enlarged the manor's library. With more than 6000 volumes it was one of the largest such collections in the region. He died on 26 March 1881 and was buried in the crypt of the local St. Dorothy's church.

His life is the subject of "Prince Roman" (1910) one of Joseph Conrad's short stories.

== Family ==
Roman married Countess Natalia Potocka on 14 May 1829 in Warsaw and had one daughter:

- Princess Maria Klementyna Sanguszko, wife of Count Alfred Józef Potocki.

His younger brother Prince Władysław Hieronim Sanguszko also participated in the November Uprising.

== Bibliography ==
- Kelmentyna Sanguszkowa, Roman Sanguszko - zesłaniec na Sybir z r. 1831 w świetle pamiętnika matki ks. Klementyny z Czartoryskich Sanguszkowej oraz korespondencji współczesnej. 1927
