= Maria Klementyna Sanguszko =

Polish noblewoman

Princess Maria Klementyna Sanguszko
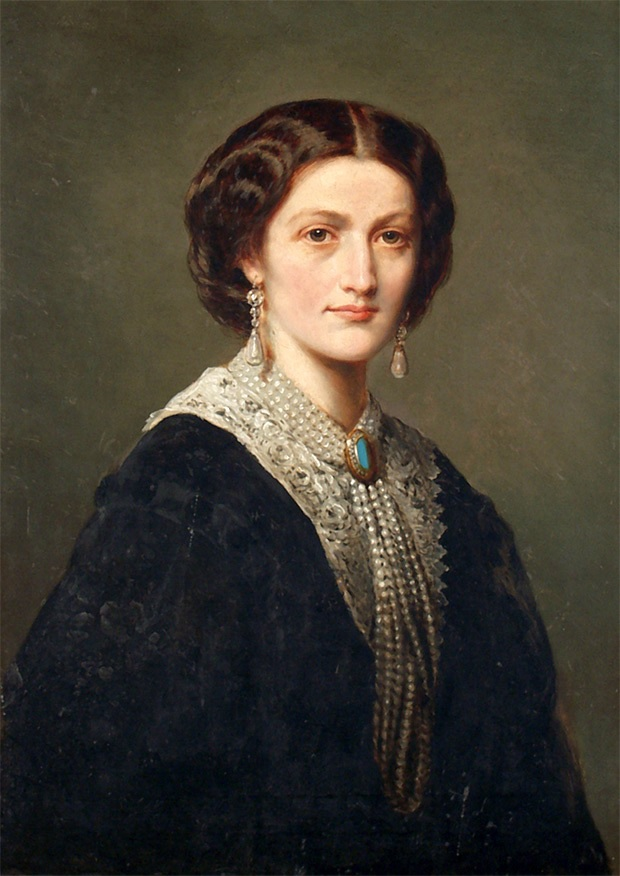
- Coat of arms: Pogoń Litewska
- Born: 30 March 1830; Slavuta, Russian Empire
- Died: 17 October 1903 (aged 73); Lemberg, Austria-Hungary
- Family: Sanguszko
- Spouse: Count Alfred Józef Potocki
- Issue: Count Roman Potocki; Countess Julia Potocka; Countess Klementyna Potocka; Count Józef Mikołaj Potocki
- Father: Prince Roman Sanguszko
- Mother: Countess Natalia Potocka

Princess Maria Klementyna Sanguszko (30 March 1830 – 17 October 1903) was a Polish noblewoman, heiress, and the wife of politician Alfred Józef Potocki.

== Biography ==
Maria was the only child of Roman Sanguszko and his wife Natalia Potocka, Polish aristocrats and members of some of the wealthiest and most notable families of the former Polish–Lithuanian Commonwealth. Her mother died soon after giving birth to her and her father was absent during her childhood as he was imprisoned from June 1831 until 1838 due to his participation in the November Uprising against Russia, and travelled extensively afterwards. In order to prevent the confiscation of his ancestral lands and property during his imprisonment, Maria was given nearly everything.

She was raised by her grandparents Eustachy Erazm Sanguszko and Klementyna Czartoryska, presumably at the Sanguszko family's Palace in Slavuta where they resided.

On 18 March 1851 she married Alfred Józef Potocki, her cousin and a man thirteen years her senior. Despite this, their marriage seemed to be a happy one and Maria flourished in her new position as a governor's wife. She was a naturally meticulous and organised person which made her duties of setting up events like balls and banquets all the easier for her.

Maria and her husband had four children: Count Roman Potocki born in 1851, Countess Julia Potocka born in 1854, Countess Klementyna Potocka born in 1856, and Count Józef Potocki born in 1862, she also raised 12 year old Teresa her husband’s daughter with Charlotte Bonaparte, who later married a diamond miner named Felice Benvenuto in Milan.

In the 1880s, her husband finally began construction on a new palace in Lviv to replace one that had been knocked down in the 1860s. Alfred would not live to see it finished, however, as he died in 1889. The Potocki Palace, Lviv was completed by Maria and their son Roman. She then transferred the Potocki family's palace in Antoniny, Ukraine to her younger son Jósef.

== Death ==
In her later years, she split her time between the Antoniny Palace in the summer and the palace in Lviv in the winter.

She died in Lviv at the age of seventy-three.

== Awards ==
- Lady of the Star-Shaped Cross Order (pl:Krzyż gwiaździsty)
