= Andrzej Potocki (1618–1663) =

Polish noble (1618–1663)

- Coat of arms: Piława
- Born: 1618
- Died: 1663 (aged 44–45)
- Family: Potocki
- Spouse: Wiktoria Elżbieta Potocka
- Father: Jakub Potocki
- Mother: Katarzyna Kłomnicka

Andrzej Potocki (1618–1663) was a Polish noble.

He was Obozny of the Crown since 1665, voivode of Bracław Voivodeship since 1662 and starost of Winnica.

Andrzej Potocki married his cousin Wiktoria Elżbieta Potocka.
