= Potocki family =

Noble family of Poland

Potocki
- Country: Poland
- Founded: 15th century (officially)
- Founder: Jakub Potocki (c. 1481-1551)
- Titles: Hetmans; Primates of Poland; Magnates; Nobles
- Estates: Poland, Lithuania, Ukraine, Croatia, Belarus

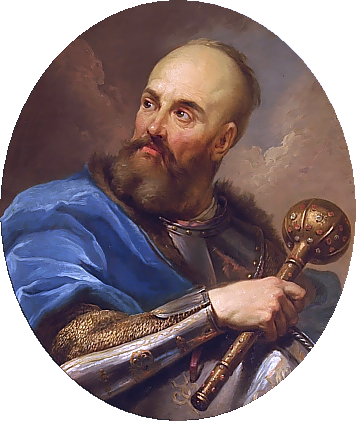
Hetman Stanisław "Rewera" Potocki

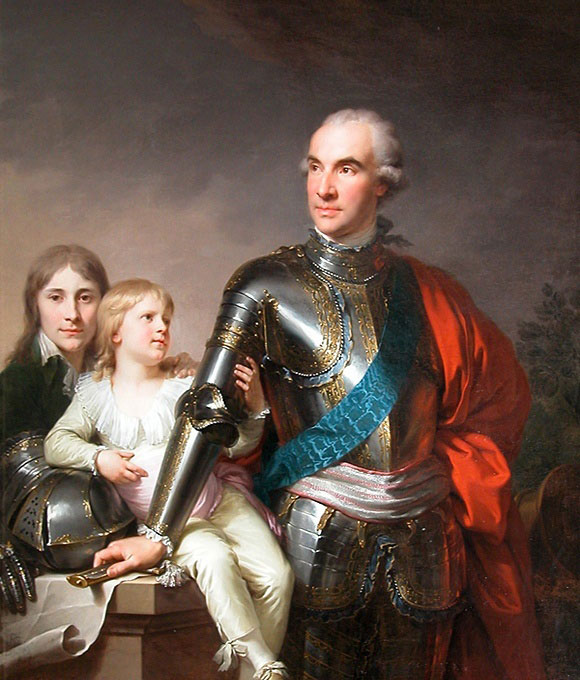
Hetman Stanisław Szczęsny Potocki

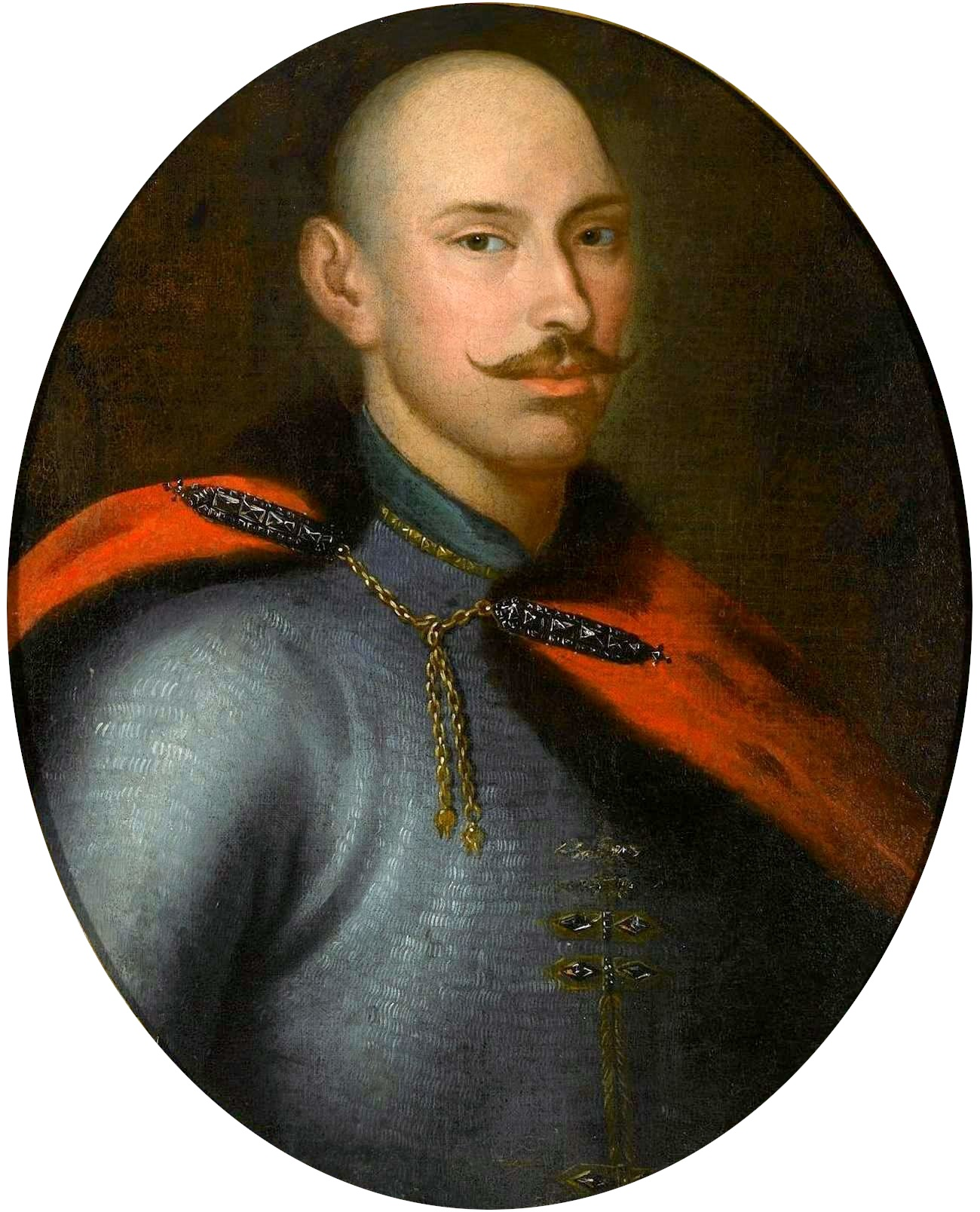
Field Hetman Andrzej Potocki

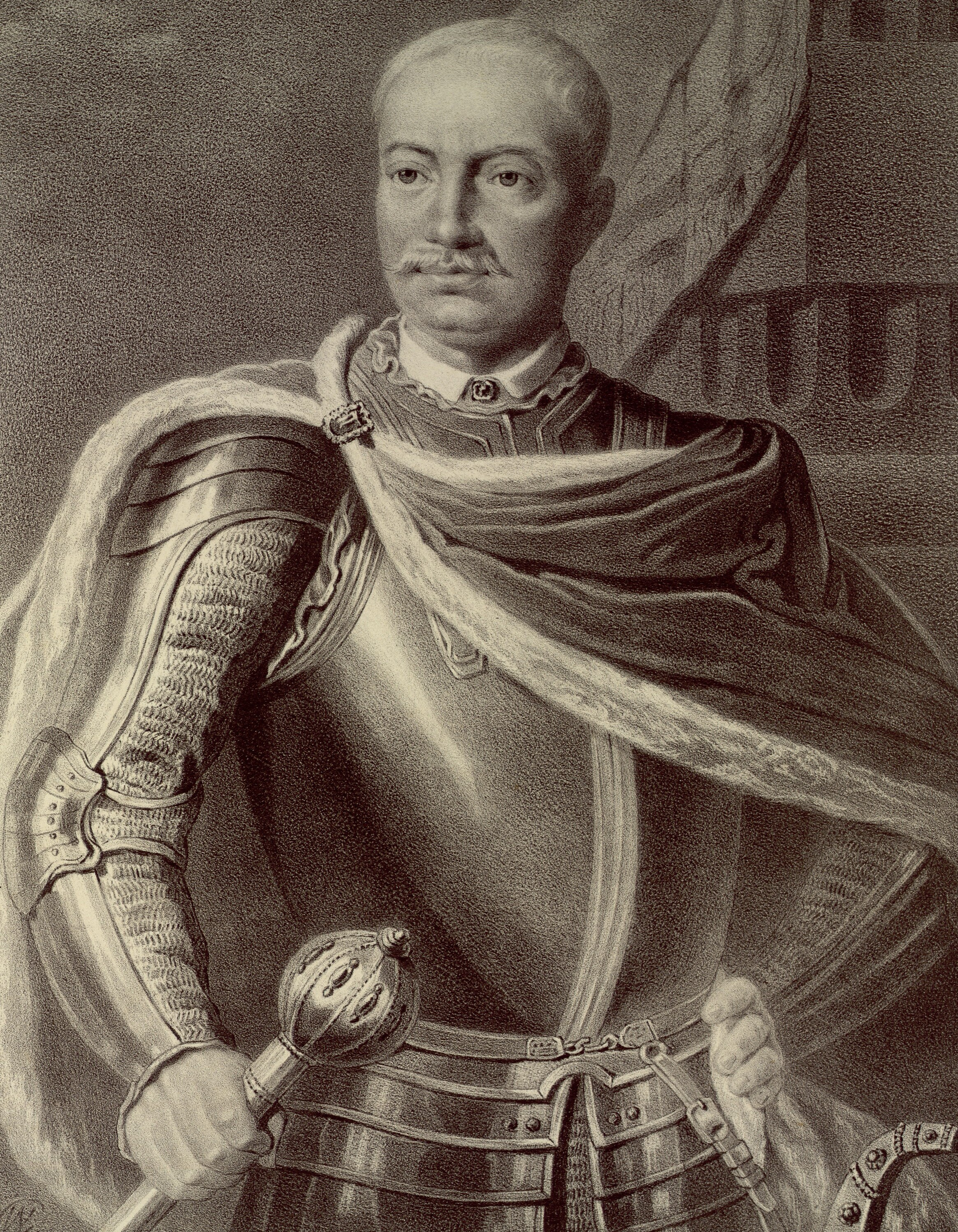
Hetman Feliks Kazimierz Potocki

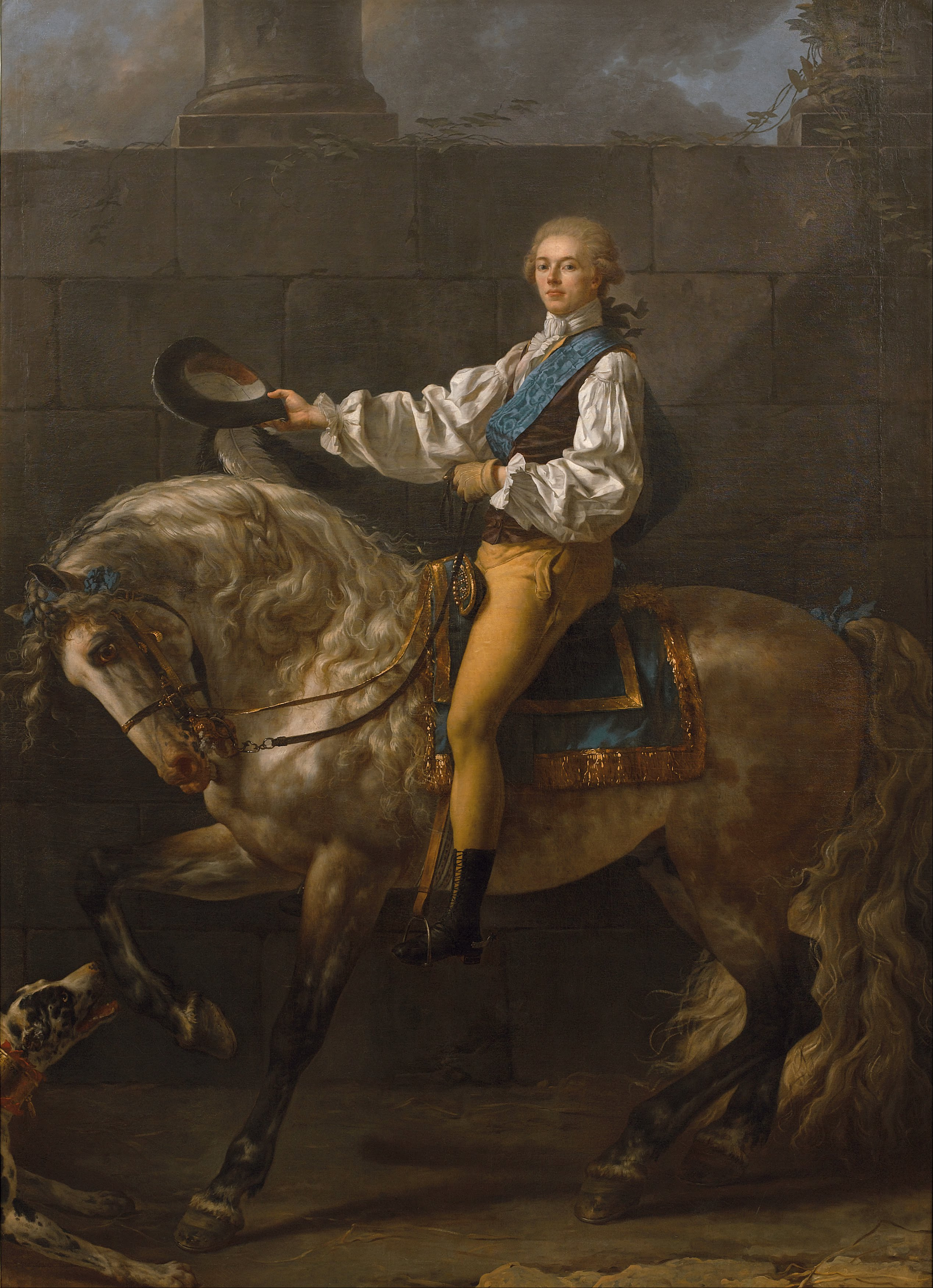
Stanisław Kostka Potocki

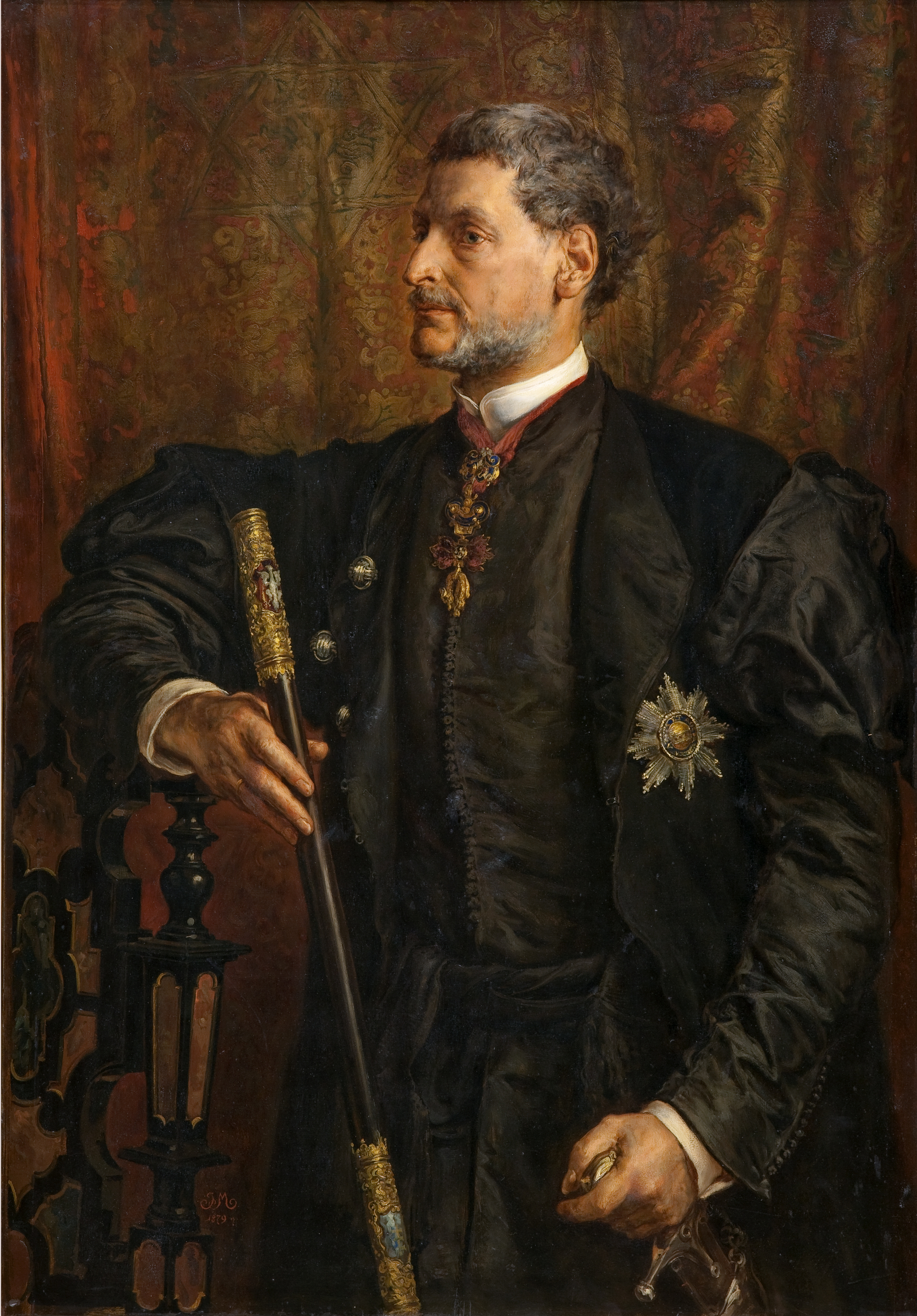
Alfred Potocki

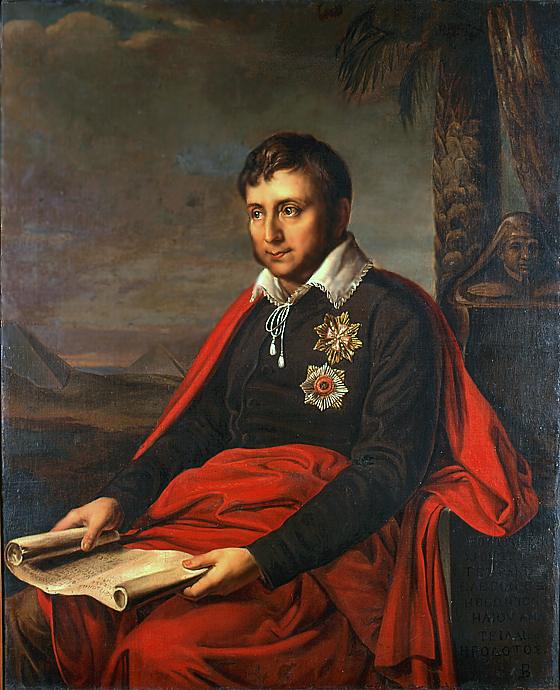
Jan Potocki

The House of Potocki (Polish pronunciation: [pɔˈtɔt͡skʲi]; plural: Potoccy, male: Potocki, feminine: Potocka) was among the leading magnate houses of the Polish–Lithuanian Commonwealth, noted for its extensive estates and political influence.

== History ==
The Potocki family originated from the small village of Potok Wielki; their family name derives from that place name. The family contributed to the cultural development and history of Poland's Eastern Borderlands (today Western Ukraine). The family is renowned for numerous Polish statesmen, military leaders, and cultural activists.

The first known Potocki was Żyrosław z Potoka (born about 1136). The children of his son Aleksander (~1167) castelan of Sandomierz, were progenitors of new noble families such as the Moskorzewski, Stanisławski, Tworowski, Borowski, and Stosłowski.

Jakub Potocki (c. 1481–1551) was the protoplast of the magnate line of the Potocki family. The magnate line split into three primary lineages, called:

- Hetman Line or Silver Pilawa, many members of which held the position of Hetman, the protoplast was Stanisław "Rewera" Potocki. The line divided into a number of branches, including Łańcut, Krzeszów, Tulczyn and Wilanów branches.
- Primate Line or Golden Pilawa, named after the most prominent member Teodor Andrzej Potocki, Primate of Poland.
- Iron Pilawa line

The "Złota Pilawa" line received the title of count from the Emperor of the Holy Roman Empire in 1606. The entire family began using the Count title after the partitions of Poland. The title was recognized 1777 and 1784 in the Kingdom of Galicia and Lodomeria and 1838, 1843, 1859, 1890 1903 in Russia and 1889 by the Pope and in the Kingdom of Poland (Congress Poland).

In 1631 Stefan Potocki, who started the "Złota Pilawa" lineage, died and was buried in Zolotyi Potik (pl. Złoty Potok, Golden Potok, a village owned by this lineage), his descendants started to use the Pilawa coat of arms in golden colour. Because of that the lineage is called the "Złota Pilawa" (Golden Piława).

There are also four branches called:

- "Gałąź łańcucka" (Branch of Łańcut)
- "Gałąź krzeszowicka" (Branch of Krzeszowice)
- "Gałąź tulczyńska" (Branch of Tulczyn)
- "Gałąź wilanowska" (branch of Wilanów)

Named after the hubs of their respective constellations of properties.

The family became prominent in the 16th and 17th centuries as a result of the patronage of Chancellor Jan Zamoyski and King Sigismund III Vasa.

== Notable family members ==
- Aleksander Stanisław Potocki (1778–1845), landowner, politician
- Alfred Józef Potocki (1817–1889), Sejm Marshal, Minister-President of Austria
- Alfred Wojciech Potocki (1785–1862), landowner, politician
- Andrzej Potocki (1630–1692), Field Crown Hetman
- Andrzej Potocki (1618–1663), Obozny and voivode
- Antoni Protazy Potocki (1761–1801), banker and voivode
- Artur Potocki (1787–1832), landowner, officer
- Ewa Józefina Julia Potocka (1818–1895), married to Prince Franz de Paula of Liechtenstein
- Feliks Kazimierz Potocki (1630–1702), Field and Great Hetman of the Crown
- Franciszek Salezy Potocki (1700–1772), Krajczy, Field Clerk of the Crown
- Ignacy Potocki (1750–1809), politician, writer and office holder.
- Jan Potocki (1761–1815), writer (The Manuscript Found in Saragossa)
- Jerzy Józef Potocki (1889–1961), diplomat, officer
- Józef Potocki (1673–1751), Great Hetman of the Crown
- Józef Potocki (?-1723), Great Guard of the Crown
- Józef Mikołaj Kazimierz Marian Alfred Jakub Potocki (1862–1922)
- Katarzyna Potocka (?–1642), was married to Janusz Radziwiłł
- Konstancja Potocka (1781–1852), was married to Jan Potocki and Edward Raczyński
- Mieczysław Ludwik Potocki (1810-1878), Polish zemianin associated with the discovery of the Zbruch Idol
- Mikołaj Potocki (1595–1651), Field and Great Crown Hetman
- Mikołaj Bazyli Potocki (1712–1782), Starost of Kaniv, benefactor of the Pochayiv Lavra
- Natalia Potocka (1810–1830), was married to Roman Sanguszko
- Roman Ignacy Potocki (1750–1809), co-author of the Polish Constitution of May 3, 1791
- Roman Potocki (1852–1915), landowner
- Seweryn Potocki (1762–1829), curator of Kharkov educational district in Russian Empire
- Stanisław Kostka Potocki (1755–1821), writer, publicist, collector and patron of art
- Stanisław "Rewera" Potocki (1579–1667), Field and Great Hetman of the Crown
- Stanisław Potocki (1659–1683), starost of Halicz and Kołomyja, rotmistrz and pułkownik of cavalry
- Stanisław Szczęsny Potocki (1753–1805), Marshal of the Targowica Confederation.
- Stefan Potocki, voivode of Bratslav (1568-1631), starosta of Fellin
- Stefan Potocki (1624–1648), starosta of Nizhyn
- Stefan Aleksander Potocki (? — 1726/1727), the founder of the Basilian Buchach basilian monastery
- Teodor Potocki (1664–1738), Primate of Poland and interrex in 1733
- Wiktoria Elżbieta Potocka (died c. 1670), was married to Adam Hieronim Sieniawski and Andrzej Potocki

== Other relatives ==
- Count Geoffrey Potocki de Montalk (1902–1997), an accomplished New Zealand poet, has been erroneously described as a "feigned member" of the Pilawa Potocki family. In fact, he is a direct descendant of the Bocki Potocki line, until recently believed to have died out with the death of Count Jozef Franciszek Jan Potocki, his great-grandfather, in Paris.

== Purported members ==
- Avraham ben Avraham, birth name Valentin Potocki. Purportedly converted to Judaism, moved to Vilna to hide his identity but was executed for heresy on May 23, 1749 (the second day of the Jewish holiday of Shavuot). His remains are believed to have been secretly buried next to the Vilna Gaon, with a monument to that effect first erected in 1927. Though his existence is generally accepted among Orthodox Jews, many secular scholars contest his existence due to a lack of primary sources. He was first mentioned in writing by Rabbi Yaakov Emden in 1755, six years after he would have died.
- Maria Patocka: said to be the mother of Crimean khan Adil Giray.
- Princess Teresa Potocki Benvenuto 1839 -1909 was the daughter of count Alfred Józef Potocki and Charlotte Bonaparte.

== Coat of arms and motto ==
The Potocki family used the Piława coat of arms, and their motto was Scutum opponebat scuto (Latin for "Shield opposing shield"; literally "He opposed shield to shield").

Silver Pilawa

Golden Pilawa

Arms of the Counts Potocki

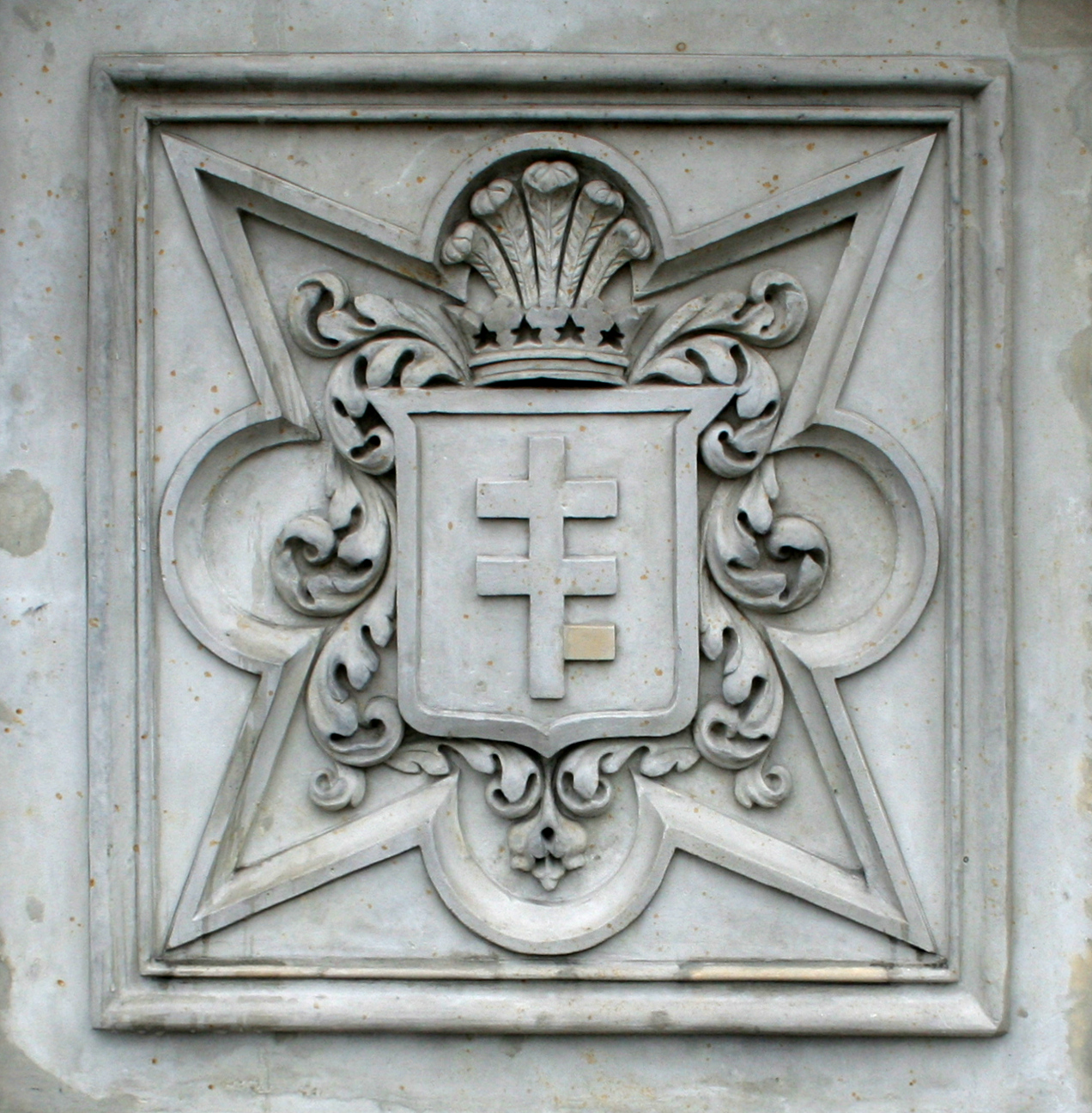
Pilawa at the Potocki mausoleum at Wilanów Park

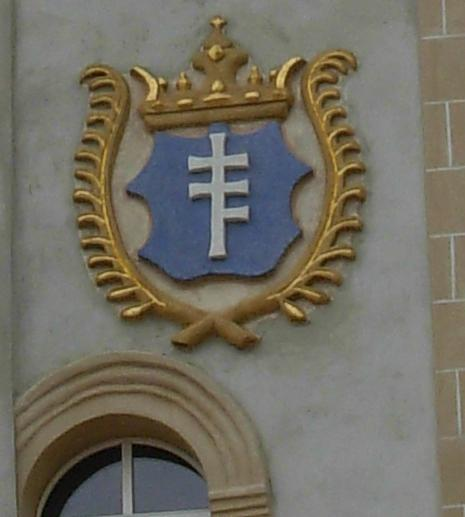
Pilawa at Leżajsk monastery

== See also ==
- Potocki Palace, several palaces associated with the Potocki family
- Pochayiv Lavra
- Piława Coat of Arms
