= Natalia Potocka =

Polish noblewoman (1807–1830)

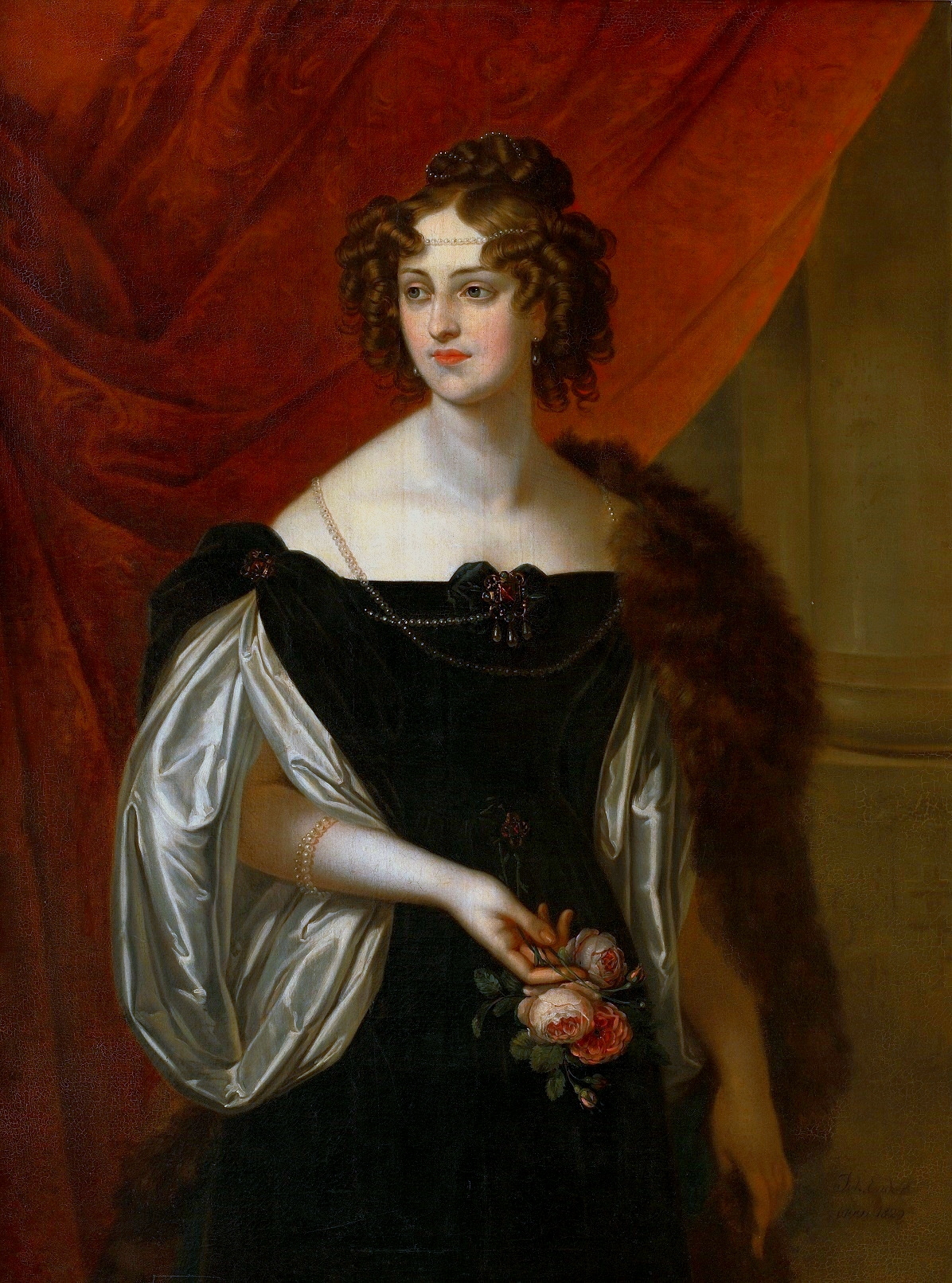
- Portrait by Johann Ender (1829)
- Born: 19 March 1807; Warsaw, Poland
- Died: 17 November 1830 (aged 23)
- Noble family: Potocki
- Spouse: Roman Sanguszko (m. 1829)
- Issue: Maria Klementyna Sanguszko
- Father: Aleksander Stanisław Potocki
- Mother: Anna Tyszkiewicz

Natalia Sanguszkowa (née Potocka; (Note: (Polish: [pɔˈtɔt͡ska])) 19 March 1807 – 17 November 1830) was a Polish noblewoman and member of the prominent Potocki family as the daughter of Aleksander Stanisław Potocki and his wife, Anna Tyszkiewicz. Natolin Park and Palace in Warsaw were named after her.

On 14 May 1829, in Warsaw, Natalia married Prince Roman Sanguszko, the son of the vice-brigadier of the National Cavalry from Sławuta. They had a daughter, Maria Klementyna Sanguszko (1830-1903), who married Count Alfred Józef Potocki on 18 March 1851 in Sławuta.

Potocka was awarded the Order of the Starry Cross. Shortly after Natalia's birth, the Potocki family renamed their estate (Bażantarnia) to Natolin in her honor, which today is a residential neighborhood in Warsaw's Ursynów. Natalia died a year after her marriage and a few months after giving birth to her daughter. Her monument-sarcophagus, created by Ludwik Kauffmann and funded by Natalia's father, Aleksander Stanisław Potocki, between 1834 and 1838, is located in the Natolin Park.
