= Aleksander Stanisław Potocki =

Polish noble and landowner (1778–1845)

Count Count Aleksander Stanisław Potocki
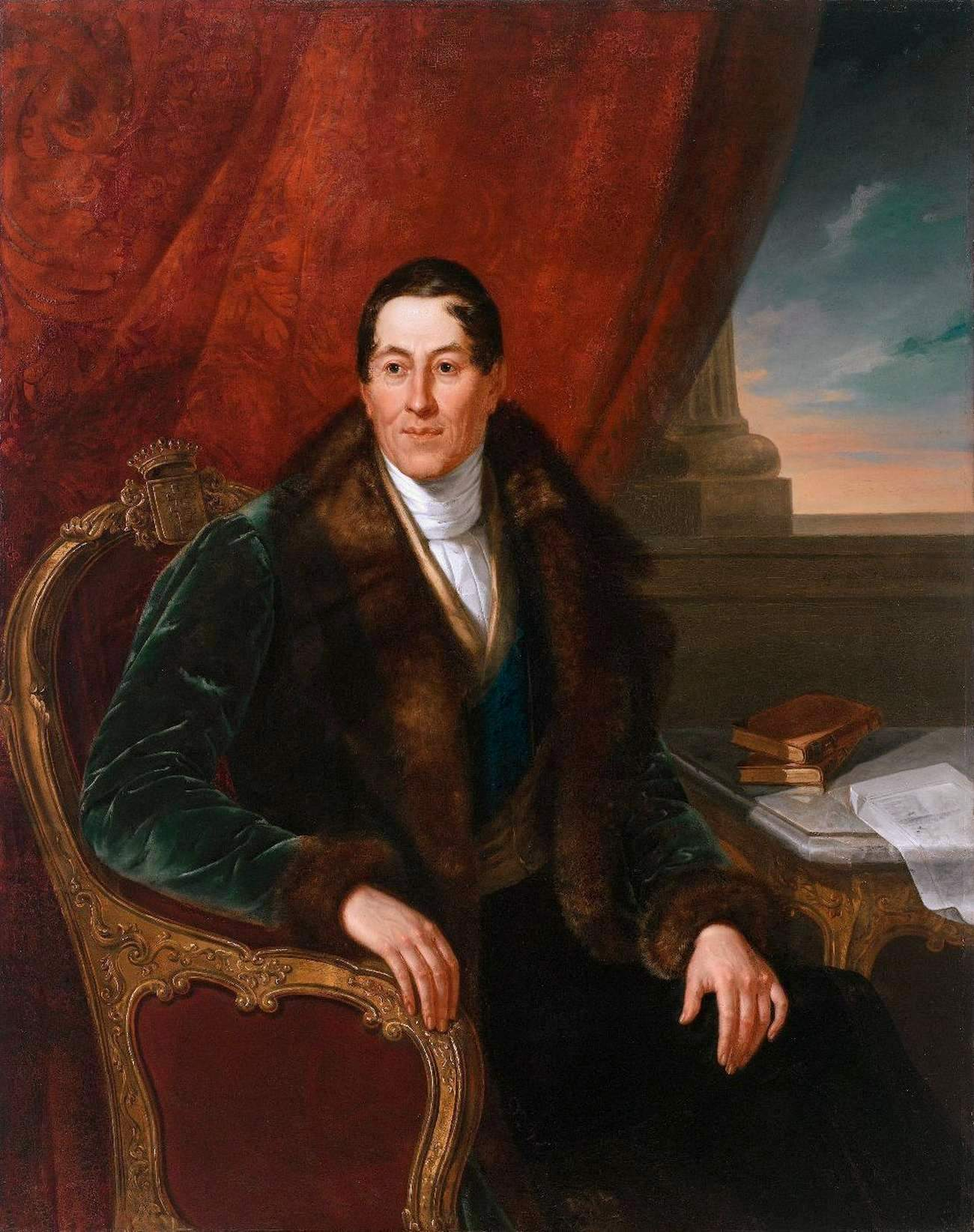
- Portrait by Aleksander Kokular, 1841

Personal details
- Born: 15 May 1778 Wilanów, Poland
- Died: 26 March 1845 (aged 66) Warsaw, Congress Poland
- Spouse(s): Anna Tyszkiewicz; Izabella Mostowska
- Children: with Anna Tyszkiewicz August Potocki Natalia Potocka Maurycy Potocki with Izabella Mostowska Stanisław Potocki
- Parents: Stanisław Kostka Potocki (father); Aleksandra Lubomirska (mother)
- Occupation: Politician and nobleman

Count Aleksander Stanisław Potocki (Polish pronunciation: [pɔˈtɔt͡skʲi], 1778–1845) was a Polish noble, landowner and politician. He was the senator-castellan of the Polish Kingdom in 1824 and chamberlain of Napoleon I. He was awarded Order of the White Eagle on 24 May 1829.

== Biography ==
=== Youth and family ===
Born in Warsaw, he was the son of the third Prime Minister of Poland Count Stanisław Kostka Potocki and his wife Aleksandra Lubomirska. On 15 May 1805, in Vilnius, he married Anna Tyszkiewicz (with whom he had Augustus, Maurycy and Natalia Potocka). The unsuccessful marriage ended in divorce in 1821. In 1823 he entered into a marriage with Izabella Mostowska, with whom he had Stanisław Potocki. He divorced Izabella soon after the birth of the child. At the end of his life Potocki was involved in a romance with a widow, Aleksandra Stokowska, which he never married.

=== Politics and career ===
In 1802 was made a Knight of Malta. From 1805 he lived with his wife in the estate in the district of Wilanów, named in 1807 in honour of his daughter Natalia – Natolin (property several times rebuilt by Piotr Aigner, and after the divorce with his first wife in the years 1821–1845 under the supervision of Henryk Marconi).

Potocki was a chamberlain Emperor Napoleon Bonaparte, 1812 has been a member of the Committee set up by him of the Provisional Government of the Grand Duchy of Lithuania. In 1824 he was the Senator-Castellan of Congress Poland. On 24 May 1829 he was awarded the Order of the White Eagle. Potocki did not participate in the November Uprising, nor in any of the sessions of the Sejm, for which in 1831 was expelled from the Senate. On 12 April 1843 he inherited the title of count.
