= Józef Mikołaj Potocki =

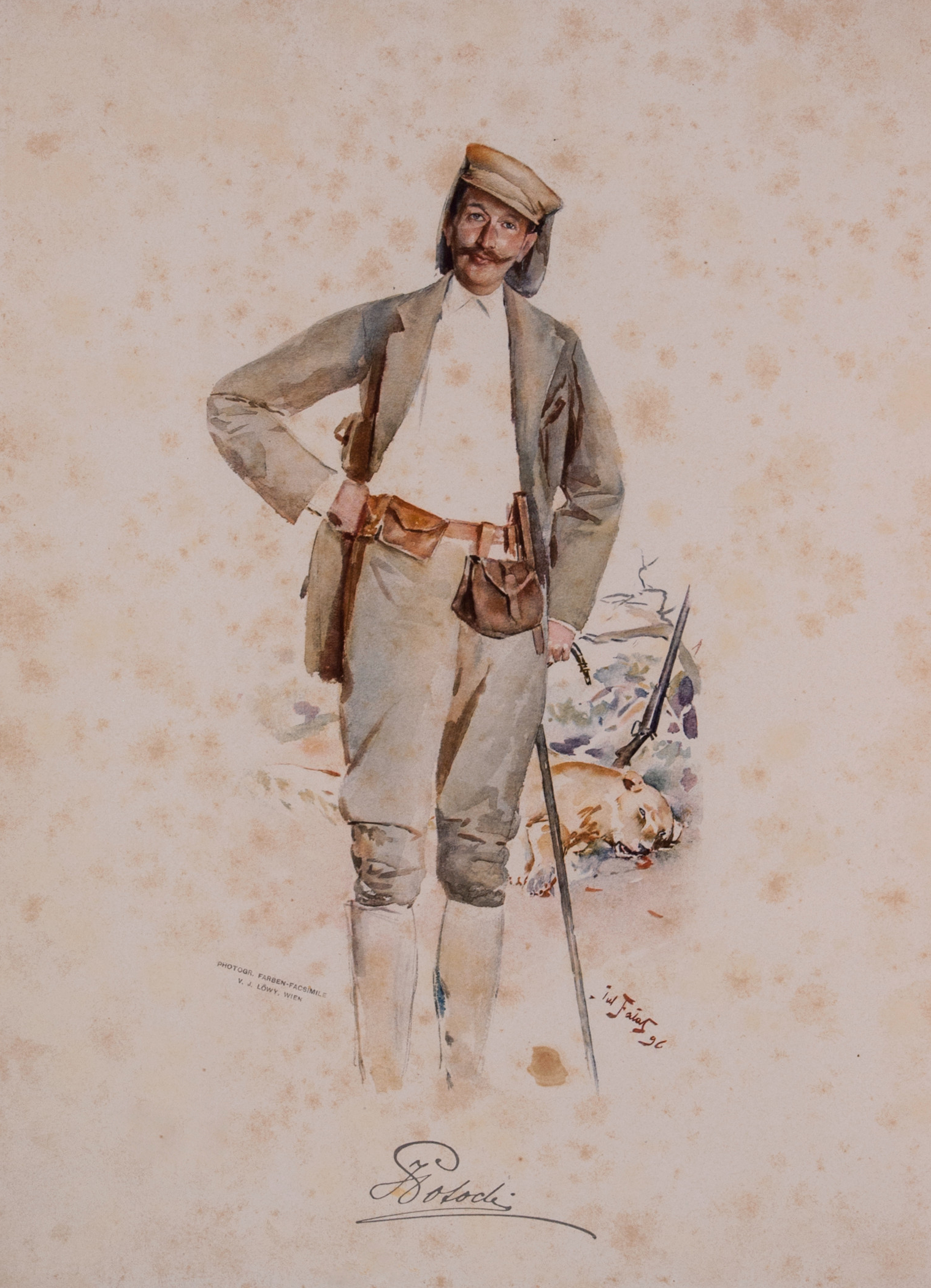
Potocki hunting in Somaliland

Count Józef Mikołaj Kazimierz Marian Alfred Jakub Potocki (Russian: Ио́сиф Альфре́дович Пото́цкий; 8 September 1862 – 25 August 1922) was a Polish nobleman, hunter, traveller and writer. A collector of books, paintings and hunting trophies, he also bred Arabian horses on his Pilawin estate and worked on reintroducing European bison into Ukraine on his hunting estate.

== Biography ==
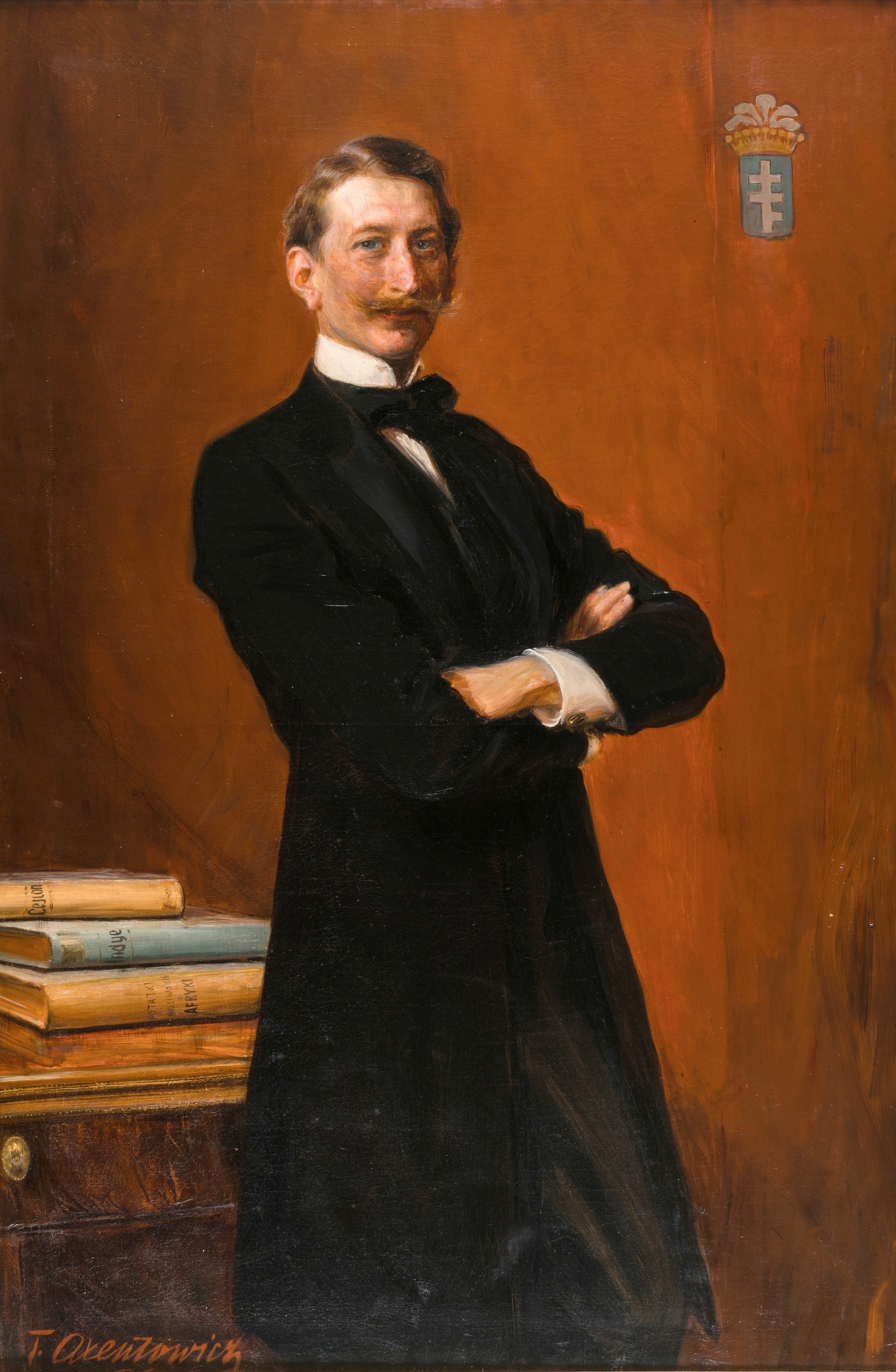
Portrait, c. 1890

Potocki was the second son of Galician governor Alfred Józef (1817–1889) owner of Łańcut and Maria née Sanguszko (1830–1903). After an early education by private tutors at home he went to the Franciscan University at Lviv where he studied law following which he returned to manage his estate. From his mother he inherited estates in Smołdyrów, Antoniny and Szepetówka in Volhynia totalling 63,000 hectares. He also inherited the palace at Krakowskie Przedmieście in Warsaw which is now the office of the Ministry of Culture in Poland. He established a horse breeding farm, travelled on hunts to Asia and Africa writing about his exploits. He also inherited a large library part of which was destroyed in World War I. One of the first attempts to bring European bison from Białowieza back into Ukraine was made by Jan Sztolcman on Potocki's hunting estate “Pylyavyn” (Novograd Volyn district of Zhitomir region). This private hunting estate was 7000 acres and stocked with both European and American bison. In 1917, the animals were killed. Richard Lydekker visited the estate in 1906 and wrote a book on it in 1908. He made his Antoniny palace into a baroque residence filled with hunting trophies and paintings.

Potocki married Helena née Radziwiłł (1874–1959) in 1892 and they had two sons: Roman Antoni (1893–1971) and Józef Alfred (1895–1968). Potocki travelled along the Blue Nile and wrote about it in 1902. He also went hunting to Somalia, India and Ceylon. He shot an elephant and wrote about his feelings as being one of achievement and questioned the sentiments of remorse expressed by other hunters in their writings. In 1911, he was made an honorary member of the Warsaw Scientific Society. He died of injuries after a car accident at Montresor in France.

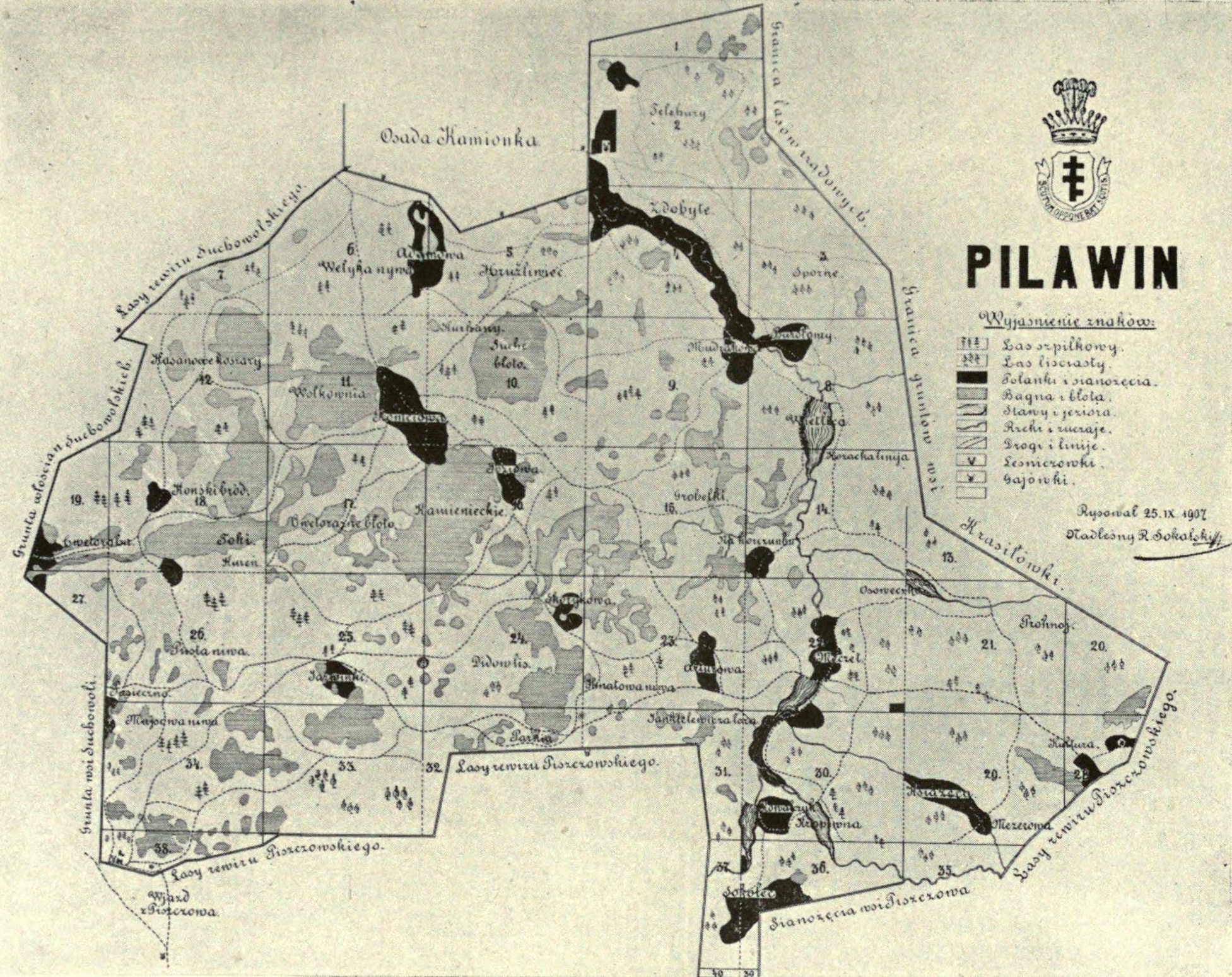
Map of Pilawin
