= Alfred Józef Potocki =

Polish aristocrat and landowner

Hochgeboren Alfred Józef Potocki
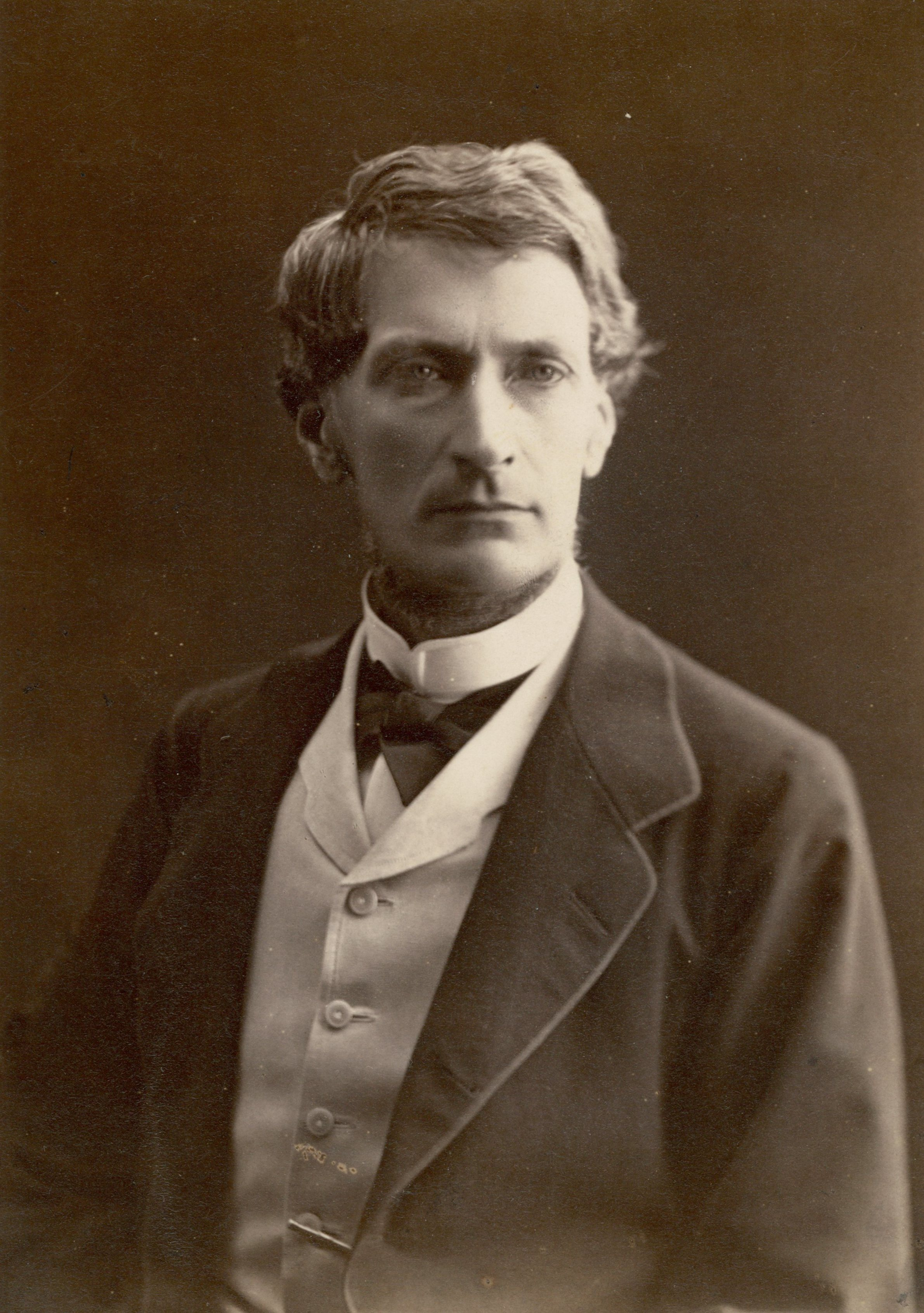

Minister-President of Austria
- In office 12 April 1870 – 6 February 1871
- Monarch: Francis Joseph I
- Preceded by: Leopold Hasner von Artha
- Succeeded by: Karl Sigmund von Hohenwart

Personal details
- Born: 29 July 1817 or 29 July 1822 Łańcut, Kingdom of Galicia and Lodomeria, Austrian Empire
- Died: 18 May 1889 (aged 71) or 18 May 1889 (aged 66) Paris, French Third Republic
- Spouse: Princess Maria Klemetyna Sanguszko
- Children: Count Roman Potocki; Countess Julia Potocka; Countess Klementyna Potocka; Count Józef Mikołaj Potocki
- Parents: Count Alfred Wojciech Potocki (father); Princess Józefina Maria Czartoryska (mother)

Count Alfred Józef Potocki (Polish pronunciation: [pɔˈtɔt͡skʲi], 29 July 1817 or 1822, Łańcut – 18 May 1889, Paris) was a Polish aristocrat (szlachcic), landowner, and a liberal-conservative monarchist Austrian politician and Prime Minister.

== Early life ==
Count Potocki was born on 29 July 1817 (or 1822) in Łańcut into a prominent Potocki family, one of the wealthiest Polish noble families, although a subject of the Empire of Austria, and inherited the Łańcut ordynat estates from his father. The son of Count Alfred Wojciech Potocki and Princess Józefina Maria Czartoryska. His grandfather was the writer Jan Potocki, best known for his famous novel The Manuscript Found in Saragossa.

Alfred Józef Potocki is known for building the magnificent Potocki Palace, a grand residence in Lviv. In 1873 he co-founded the Polish Academy of Learning in Kraków. He ran a family distillery, which is today known as Polmos Łańcut.

== Career ==
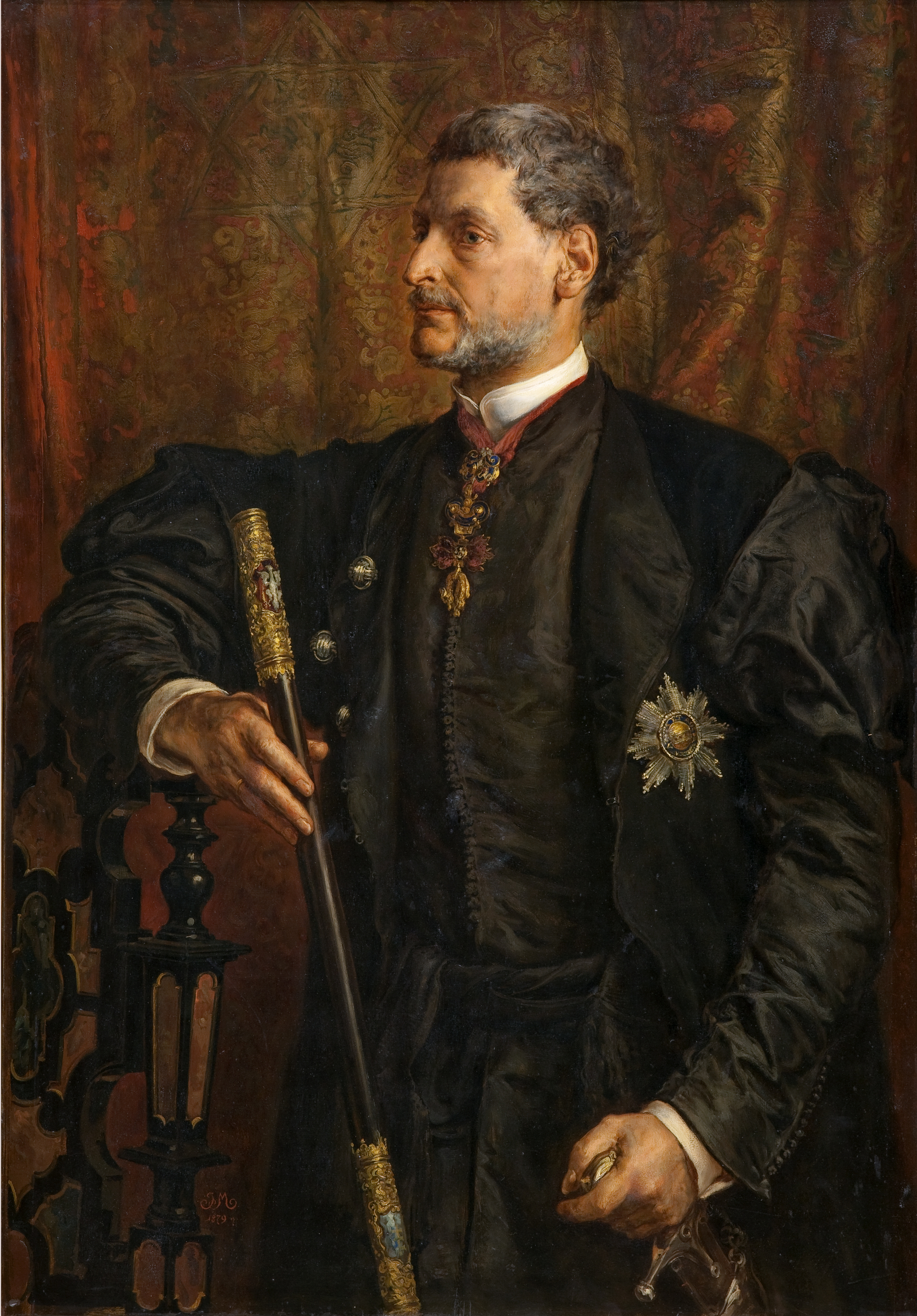
Jan Matejko, Portrait of Alfred Potocki (1879)

He was a member of the National Sejm of Galicia from 1863 to 1889 and Sejm Marshal from 1875 until 1877. From 1875 to 1883 he was governor of Galicia.

In 1848 he became a member of the lower house of the Imperial Parliament (Reichsrat), the House of Deputies (Abgeordnetenhaus), and in 1861 the upper house, the House of Lords (Herrenhaus). He served in the Diplomatic Corps and was Minister of Agriculture of Austria from 30 December 1867 until 15 January 1870, but stepped down over his minority federalist views in the cabinet.

He served as Austria's prime minister from 1870 to 1871, and was one of the only two non-Germans who held this office in Austria-Hungary. On 12 April 1870, he became the 5th Minister-President of Cisleithania and simultaneously Minister of Defence. His tenure included the repeal of the 1855 concordat. He was unsuccessful in promoting federalism and failing to obtain the cooperation of the Czechs in the Reichsrat he stepped down on 6 February 1871, ushering in a brief interregnum of conservative rule under Count Karl Sigmund von Hohenwart (February 1871 – October 1871) which was equally ineffective in implementing federalism, so that power quickly reverted to liberalism again.

== Personal life ==
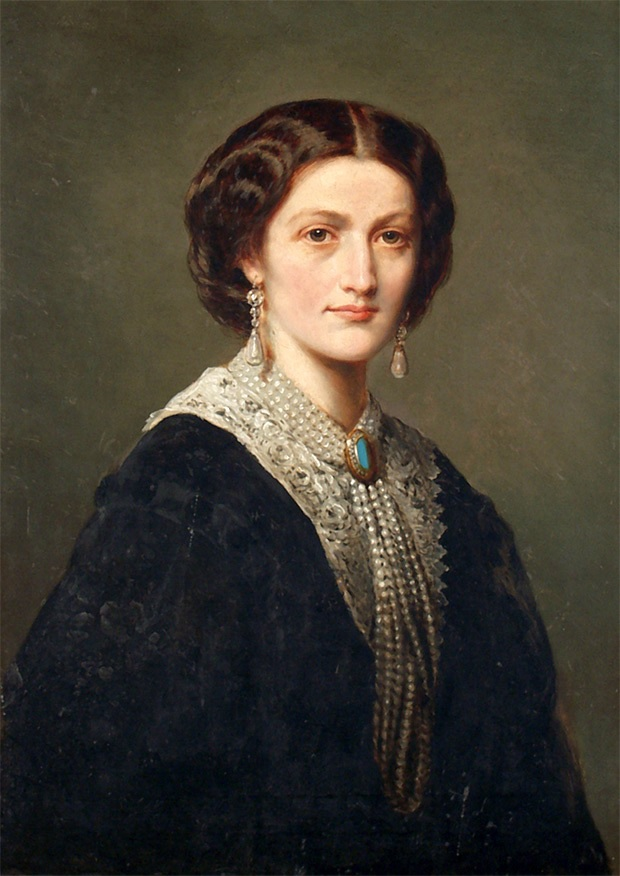
Portrait of his wife, Princess Maria Klementyna Sanguszko, by Franz Xaver Winterhalter, 1857

On 18 March 1851 in Sławuta, he married Princess Maria Klementyna Sanguszko, heiress of the prominent Sanguszko princely family. Together, they had two sons and two daughters:

- Count Roman Potocki (1852–1915), who married Princess Elżbieta Matylda Radziwiłł, eldest daughter of Prince Antoni Wilhelm Radziwiłł and Marie de Castellane.
- Countess Julia Potocka (1854–1921), who married Count Vladislaus Branicki.
- Countess Klementyna Potocka (1856–1921), who married Count Jan Leon Antoni Tyszkiewicz, son of Count Michał Tyszkiewicz.
- Count Józef Mikołaj Potocki (1862–1922), who married Princess Helena Augusta Radziwiłł, younger daughter of Prince Antoni Wilhelm Radziwiłł.

Count Potocki died on 18 May 1889 in Paris.

== Awards ==
- Knight of the Order of the Golden Fleece
- Order of the Steel Crown
- Knight Grand Cross of the Order of St. Stephen
- Order of Carol I

== Bibliography ==
- W. Goldinger – J. Zdrada: Potocki, Alfred Graf. In: Österreichisches Biographisches Lexikon 1815–1950 (ÖBL). Band 8, Verlag der Österreichischen Akademie der Wissenschaften, Wien 1983, ISBN 3-7001-0187-2, S. 230.
- Meyers Großes Konversations-Lexikon Band 16, Leipzig 1908, S. 235.
- Christian Schärf: Ausgleichspolitik und Pressekampf in der Ära Hohenwart. Die Fundamentalartikel von 1871 und der deutsch-tschechische Konflikt in Böhmen. Verlag Oldenbourg, München 1996, ISBN 3-486-56147-2, S. 75.
