= Krasnoarmeysky (inhabited locality) =

Krasnoarmeysky (Russian: Красноарме́йский; masculine), Krasnoarmeyskaya (Красноарме́йская; feminine), or Krasnoarmeyskoye (Красноарме́йское; neuter) is the name of several inhabited localities in Russia.

== Republic of Adygea ==
As of 2010, one rural locality in the Republic of Adygea bears this name:

- Krasnoarmeysky, Republic of Adygea, a khutor in Takhtamukaysky District

== Altai Krai ==
As of 2010, two rural localities in Altai Krai bear this name:

- Krasnoarmeysky, Nemetsky natsionalny District, Altai Krai, a settlement in Kusaksky Selsoviet of Nemetsky National District
- Krasnoarmeysky, Pankrushikhinsky District, Altai Krai, a settlement in Zyatkovsky Selsoviet of Pankrushikhinsky District

== Republic of Bashkortostan ==
As of 2010, one rural locality in the Republic of Bashkortostan bears this name:

- Krasnoarmeyskaya, a village in Pervomaysky Selsoviet of Sterlitamaksky District

== Chelyabinsk Oblast ==
As of 2010, one rural locality in Chelyabinsk Oblast bears this name:

- Krasnoarmeysky, Chelyabinsk Oblast, a settlement in Kateninsky Selsoviet of Varnensky District

== Chukotka Autonomous Okrug ==
As of 2010, one urban locality in Chukotka Autonomous Okrug bears this name:

- Krasnoarmeysky, Chukotka Autonomous Okrug, an urban-type settlement in Chaunsky District

== Chuvash Republic ==
As of 2010, one rural locality in the Chuvash Republic bears this name:

- Krasnoarmeyskoye, Chuvash Republic, a selo in Krasnoarmeyskoye Rural Settlement of Krasnoarmeysky District

== Republic of Dagestan ==
As of 2010, one rural locality in the Republic of Dagestan bears this name:

- Krasnoarmeyskoye, Republic of Dagestan, a selo under the administrative jurisdiction of Kirovsky City District of the City of Makhachkala

== Ivanovo Oblast ==
As of 2010, one rural locality in Ivanovo Oblast bears this name:

- Krasnoarmeyskoye, Ivanovo Oblast, a selo in Shuysky District

== Kabardino-Balkar Republic ==
As of 2010, one rural locality in the Kabardino-Balkar Republic bears this name:

- Krasnoarmeyskoye, Kabardino-Balkar Republic, a selo in Tersky District

== Kaliningrad Oblast ==
As of 2010, one rural locality in Kaliningrad Oblast bears this name:

- Krasnoarmeyskoye, Kaliningrad Oblast, a settlement in Dolgorukovsky Rural Okrug of Bagrationovsky District

== Krasnodar Krai ==
As of 2010, six rural localities in Krasnodar Krai bear this name:

- Krasnoarmeysky, Kavkazsky District, Krasnodar Krai, a settlement in Mirskoy Rural Okrug of Kavkazsky District
- Krasnoarmeysky, Novopokrovsky District, Krasnodar Krai, a settlement in Nezamayevsky Rural Okrug of Novopokrovsky District
- Krasnoarmeysky, Temryuksky District, Krasnodar Krai, a settlement in Zaporozhsky Rural Okrug of Temryuksky District
- Krasnoarmeysky, Novokorsunsky Rural Okrug, Timashyovsky District, Krasnodar Krai, a khutor in Novokorsunsky Rural Okrug of Timashyovsky District
- Krasnoarmeysky, Poselkovy Rural Okrug, Timashyovsky District, Krasnodar Krai, a settlement in Poselkovy Rural Okrug of Timashyovsky District
- Krasnoarmeyskoye, Krasnodar Krai, a selo in Kukharivsky Rural Okrug of Yeysky District

== Leningrad Oblast ==
As of 2010, one rural locality in Leningrad Oblast bears this name:

- Krasnoarmeyskoye, Leningrad Oblast, a logging depot settlement in Gromovskoye Settlement Municipal Formation of Priozersky District

== Republic of Mordovia ==
As of 2010, one rural locality in the Republic of Mordovia bears this name:

- Krasnoarmeysky, Republic of Mordovia, a settlement in Krasnoarmeysky Selsoviet of Torbeyevsky District

== Oryol Oblast ==
As of 2010, one rural locality in Oryol Oblast bears this name:

- Krasnoarmeysky, Oryol Oblast, a settlement in Malakhovo-Slobodskoy Selsoviet of Trosnyansky District

== Primorsky Krai ==
As of 2010, one rural locality in Primorsky Krai bears this name:

- Krasnoarmeysky, Primorsky Krai, a railway crossing loop under the administrative jurisdiction of Partizansk Town Under Krai Jurisdiction

== Rostov Oblast ==
As of 2010, six rural localities in Rostov Oblast bear this name:

- Krasnoarmeysky, Kagalnitsky District, Rostov Oblast, a khutor in Khomutovskoye Rural Settlement of Kagalnitsky District
- Krasnoarmeysky, Novoselovskoye Rural Settlement, Martynovsky District, Rostov Oblast, a khutor in Novoselovskoye Rural Settlement of Martynovsky District
- Krasnoarmeysky, Yuzhnenskoye Rural Settlement, Martynovsky District, Rostov Oblast, a settlement in Yuzhnenskoye Rural Settlement of Martynovsky District
- Krasnoarmeysky, Orlovsky District, Rostov Oblast, a settlement in Krasnoarmeyskoye Rural Settlement of Orlovsky District
- Krasnoarmeysky, Verkhnedonskoy District, Rostov Oblast, a khutor in Meshkovskoye Rural Settlement of Verkhnedonskoy District
- Krasnoarmeysky, Zernogradsky District, Rostov Oblast, a khutor in Donskoye Rural Settlement of Zernogradsky District

== Ryazan Oblast ==
As of 2010, one rural locality in Ryazan Oblast bears this name:

- Krasnoarmeysky, Ryazan Oblast, a settlement in Aladyinsky Rural Okrug of Chuchkovsky District

== Samara Oblast ==
As of 2010, one rural locality in Samara Oblast bears this name:

- Krasnoarmeyskoye, Samara Oblast, a selo in Krasnoarmeysky District

== Saratov Oblast ==
As of 2010, three rural localities in Saratov Oblast bear this name:

- Krasnoarmeysky, Saratov Oblast, a settlement in Romanovsky District
- Krasnoarmeyskoye, Engelssky District, Saratov Oblast, a selo in Engelssky District
- Krasnoarmeyskoye, Kalininsky District, Saratov Oblast, a selo in Kalininsky District

== Sverdlovsk Oblast ==
As of 2010, one rural locality in Sverdlovsk Oblast bears this name:

- Krasnoarmeysky, Sverdlovsk Oblast, a settlement under the administrative jurisdiction of the Town of Asbest

== Ulyanovsk Oblast ==
As of 2010, one rural locality in Ulyanovsk Oblast bears this name:

- Krasnoarmeysky, Ulyanovsk Oblast, a settlement in Zelenoroshchinsky Rural Okrug of Ulyanovsky District

== Volgograd Oblast ==
As of 2010, two rural localities in Volgograd Oblast bear this name:

- Krasnoarmeysky, Kumylzhensky District, Volgograd Oblast, a khutor in Krasnoarmeysky Selsoviet of Kumylzhensky District
- Krasnoarmeysky, Novonikolayevsky District, Volgograd Oblast, a settlement in Krasnoarmeysky Selsoviet of Novonikolayevsky District

== Voronezh Oblast ==
As of 2010, one rural locality in Voronezh Oblast bears this name:

- Krasnoarmeysky, Voronezh Oblast, a settlement under the administrative jurisdiction of Ertilskoye Urban Settlement of Ertilsky District

== See also ==
- Krasnoarmeysk (disambiguation)
