= Abubachir Chuts =

- ШІуцІэ Батырбый ыкъо Абубэчыр
- Born: 1912; Panakhes, Yekaterinodar Otdel, Kuban Oblast, Russian Empire
- Died: 1944-03-28; Mykolaiv, Ukrainian SSR, Soviet Union
- Military career
- Allegiance: Soviet Union
- Branch: Soviet Navy; Soviet Naval Infantry
- Service years: 1941–1944
- Rank: Krasnoflotets (Seaman)
- Unit: 384th Independent Naval Infantry Battalion
- Conflicts: World War II
- Awards: Hero of the Soviet Union; Order of Lenin; Order of the Patriotic War 1st Class

Abubachir Chuts (Adyghe: ШІуцІэ Батырбый ыкъо Абубэчыр; 1912 – March 28, 1944) was a Soviet Circassian seaman and a posthumous Hero of the Soviet Union.

== Biography ==
He was born in 1912 in the aul of Panakhes in the Kuban Oblast (now in the Takhtamukaysky District of the Republic of Adygea) to a Circassian peasant family. After graduating from primary school, he worked on a kolkhoz as a shepherd. He was later elected as a member of the kolkhoz board. He served in the Soviet Navy starting in 1941. Called up from the reserve, he was assigned to the naval infantry of the Black Sea Fleet and joined the active army in June 1941. He fought in the 325th Naval Infantry Battalion and participated in the battles at Malaya Zemlya near Novorossiysk. In May 1943, Seaman Chuts was assigned to the newly formed 384th Independent Naval Infantry Battalion of the Black Sea Fleet. In the fall of 1943, he participated in amphibious landing operations in the cities along the Sea of Azov coast: Taganrog, Mariupol, and Osipenko (now Berdyansk). For the heroism he displayed during the Mariupol landing, he was awarded the Order of the Patriotic War 1st class. This was followed by combat on the Kinburn Spit and the liberation of the settlements of Aleksandrovka, Bogoyavlenskoye (now Zhovtneve), and Shirokaya Balka in the Kherson Oblast.

In the second half of March 1944, the troops of the 28th Army launched an offensive to liberate the city of Mykolaiv. To facilitate the frontal assault of the advancing troops, command decided to land a force in the port of Mykolaiv. A landing group was formed from the 384th Independent Naval Infantry Battalion under the command of Senior Lieutenant Konstantin Olshansky. The detachment consisted of 55 marines, 2 signalmen from army headquarters, and 10 sappers. A local fisherman, Andrey Andreev, served as their guide. One of the marines in this detachment was Seaman Chuts. On the night of March 26, 1944, near the village of Bogoyavlenskoye (now within the city limits of Mykolaiv), the detachment boarded seven boats, traveled 15 kilometers up the Southern Bug river, and landed in the port of Mykolaiv at dawn.

For two days, the detachment engaged in heavy combat, repelling 18 enemy counterattacks and killing up to 700 enemy soldiers and officers. On March 28, 1944, only six surviving marines, barely able to stand, emerged from the ruins of the port office under the command of Petty Officer 2nd Class Kirill Bochkovich; two more were immediately sent to the hospital. In the ruins of the office, they found four more marines alive, but they died of their wounds later that same day. All officers, petty officers, sergeants, and many of the seamen were killed in action. Seaman A.B. Chuts was among the fallen.

He was buried in a mass grave in the city of Mykolaiv in the Square of the 68 Paratroopers. He was posthumously awarded the title of Hero of the Soviet Union on April 20, 1945.

== Awards ==
- Hero of the Soviet Union (April 20, 1945)
  - "Gold Star" Medal
  - Order of Lenin
- Order of the Patriotic War 1st class

== Memorials ==
- The Hero's name is engraved in gold letters in the Hall of Glory at the Central Museum of the Great Patriotic War in Victory Park, Moscow.
- He is buried in a mass grave in the city of Mykolaiv in the Square of the 68 Paratroopers.
- In Mykolaiv, a People's Museum of Combat Glory of Naval Marines was opened, a monument was erected, and a street was named in their honor.
- Streets in the auls of Panakhes, Takhtamukay, and Afipsip are named after him.
- In the aul of Panakhes, Secondary School No. 7 is named after the Hero, and a monument honoring him was erected on its grounds.

== See also ==
- List of Heroes of the Soviet Union
