= Lychak =

Lychak Лычак
- Settlement
- Location within Volgograd Oblast Location within Russia
- Coordinates: 49°50′N 43°47′E
- Country: Russia
- Region: Volgograd Oblast
- District: Frolovsky District
- Time zone: UTC+4:00

Lychak (Russian: Лычак) is a rural locality (a settlement) and the administrative center of Lychakskoye Rural Settlement, Frolovsky District, Volgograd Oblast, Russia. The population was 604 as of 2010.

== Geography ==
Lychak is located 13 km northeast of Prigorodny (the district's administrative centre) by road. Amelino is the nearest rural locality.
