= Muravli =

Muravli Муравли
- Khutor
- Location within Volgograd Oblast Location within Russia
- Coordinates: 50°05′N 44°01′E
- Country: Russia
- Region: Volgograd Oblast
- District: Frolovsky District
- Time zone: UTC+4:00

Muravli (Russian: Муравли) is a rural locality (a khutor) in Malodelskoye Rural Settlement, Frolovsky District, Volgograd Oblast, Russia. The population was 1 as of 2010.

== Geography ==
Muravli is located 71 km northeast of Prigorodny (the district's administrative centre) by road. Malodelskaya is the nearest rural locality.
