= Balanda =

Balanda may refer to:

== Places ==
- Kalininsk, Saratov Oblast, Russia, named Balanda until 1962
- Balanda River, Russia, a tributary of the Medveditsa
- BALANDA, code for Lieutenant Vicente Landaeta Gil Air Base, an air base in Venezuela

== People ==
- Balanda Atis, American cosmetic chemist
- Balanda Boor people, an ethnic group in South Sudan
- Balanda Bviri people, an ethnic group in South Sudan
- Pierre Bertran de Balanda (1887–1946), French Olympic horse rider
- Ruslan Balanda, Ukrainian skier

== Other uses ==
- Balanda, a loanword in many Aboriginal languages in Arnhem Land, meaning a white person or European, derived from Makasar Balanda, from Malay Belanda, from Portuguese Holanda, and now widely used in Aboriginal English in the Northern Territory.
- Balanda, another term for the native vinta boat of the Philippines
