= Kudinovsky, Frolovsky District, Volgograd Oblast =

Kudinovsky Кудиновский
- Khutor
- Location within Volgograd Oblast Location within Russia
- Coordinates: 50°01′N 43°41′E
- Country: Russia
- Region: Volgograd Oblast
- District: Frolovsky District
- Time zone: UTC+4:00

Kudinovsky (Russian: Кудиновский) is a rural locality (a khutor) in Bolshelychakskoye Rural Settlement, Frolovsky District, Volgograd Oblast, Russia. The population was 8 as of 2010.

== Geography ==
Kudinovsky is located in steppe, on the right bank of the Lychak River, 57 km north of Prigorodny (the district's administrative centre) by road. Bolshoy Lychak is the nearest rural locality.
