= Parizhskaya Kommuna, Volgograd Oblast =

Parizhskaya Kommuna Парижская Коммуна
- Khutor
- Location within Volgograd Oblast Location within Russia
- Coordinates: 49°57′N 43°53′E
- Country: Russia
- Region: Volgograd Oblast
- District: Frolovsky District
- Time zone: UTC+4:00

Parizhskaya Kommuna (Russian: Парижская Коммуна) is a rural locality (a khutor) in Lychakskoye Rural Settlement, Frolovsky District, Volgograd Oblast, Russia. The population was 2 as of 2010.

== Geography ==
Parizhskaya Kommuna is located in center of Frolovsky District, 32 km northeast of Prigorodny (the district's administrative centre) by road. Blagodatny is the nearest rural locality.
