= Shlyakhovsky =

Shlyakhovsky Шляховский
- Khutor
- Location within Volgograd Oblast Location within Russia
- Coordinates: 49°35′N 43°41′E
- Country: Russia
- Region: Volgograd Oblast
- District: Frolovsky District
- Time zone: UTC+4:00

Shlyakhovsky (Russian: Шляховский) is a rural locality (a khutor) in Krasnolipovskoye Rural Settlement, Frolovsky District, Volgograd Oblast, Russia. The population was 142 as of 2010.

== Geography ==
Shlyakhovsky is located 29 km southeast of Prigorodny (the district's administrative centre) by road. Krasnye Lipki is the nearest rural locality.
