= Shkolny, Volgograd Oblast =

Shkolny Школьный
- Settlement
- Location within Volgograd Oblast Location within Russia
- Coordinates: 49°47′N 43°25′E
- Country: Russia
- Region: Volgograd Oblast
- District: Frolovsky District
- Time zone: UTC+4:00

Shkolny (Russian: Школьный) is a rural locality (a settlement) in Vetyutnevskoye Rural Settlement, Frolovsky District, Volgograd Oblast, Russia. The population was 208 as of 2010.

== Geography ==
Shkolny is located on the Archede River, 20 km west of Prigorodny (the district's administrative centre) by road. Kolobrodov is the nearest rural locality.
