= Malodelskaya =

Malodelskaya Малодельская
- Stanitsa
- Location within Volgograd Oblast Location within Russia
- Coordinates: 50°11′N 43°53′E
- Country: Russia
- Region: Volgograd Oblast
- District: Frolovsky District
- Time zone: UTC+4:00

Malodelskaya (Russian: Малодельская) is a rural locality (a stanitsa) and the administrative center of Malodelskoye Rural Settlement, Frolovsky District, Volgograd Oblast, Russia. The population was 1,348 as of 2010.

== Geography ==
Malodelskaya is located on Bezymyannaya River, 58 km northeast of Prigorodny (the district's administrative centre) by road. Zapolyansky is the nearest rural locality.
