= Krasnoarmeysky District, Russia =

Name of several divisions in Russia

Krasnoarmeysky District is the name of several administrative and municipal divisions in Russia. The districts are generally named for the Red Army.

== Districts of the federal subjects ==
Federal subjects of Russia which have an entity called Krasnoarmeysky District

- Krasnoarmeysky District, Chelyabinsk Oblast, an administrative and municipal district of Chelyabinsk Oblast
- Krasnoarmeysky District, Chuvash Republic, an administrative and municipal district of the Chuvash Republic
- Krasnoarmeysky District, Krasnodar Krai, an administrative and municipal district of Krasnodar Krai
- Krasnoarmeysky District, Primorsky Krai, an administrative and municipal district of Primorsky Krai
- Krasnoarmeysky District, Samara Oblast, an administrative and municipal district of Samara Oblast
- Krasnoarmeysky District, Saratov Oblast, an administrative and municipal district of Saratov Oblast

== City divisions ==
Location of Volgograd in Russia
- Krasnoarmeysky City District, a city district of Volgograd, the administrative center of Volgograd Oblast

== See also ==
- Krasnoarmeysky (disambiguation)
- Krasnoarmeysk (disambiguation)
