= Nizhniye Lipki =

Nizhniye Lipki Нижние Липки
- Khutor
- Location within Volgograd Oblast Location within Russia
- Coordinates: 49°37′N 43°59′E
- Country: Russia
- Region: Volgograd Oblast
- District: Frolovsky District
- Time zone: UTC+4:00

Nizhniye Lipki (Russian: Нижние Липки) is a rural locality (a khutor) in Pisaryovskoye Rural Settlement, Frolovsky District, Volgograd Oblast, Russia. The population was 48 as of 2010.

== Geography ==
Nizhniye Lipki is located in southeast of Frolovsky District, on Shiryay River, 40 km southeast of Prigorodny (the district's administrative centre) by road. Pisarevka is the nearest rural locality.
