= Dudachensky =

Dudachensky Дудаченский
- Settlement
- Location within Volgograd Oblast Location within Russia
- Coordinates: 49°59′N 44°10′E
- Country: Russia
- Region: Volgograd Oblast
- District: Frolovsky District
- Time zone: UTC+4:00

Dudachensky (Russian: Дудаченский) is a rural locality (a settlement) and the administrative center of Dudachenskoye Rural Settlement, Frolovsky District, Volgograd Oblast, Russia. The population was 576 as of 2010.

== Geography ==
Dudachensky is located 54 km northeast of Prigorodny (the district's administrative centre) by road. Blagodatny is the nearest rural locality.
