= Russko-Osinovsky =

Russko-Osinovsky Русско-Осиновский
- Khutor
- Location within Volgograd Oblast Location within Russia
- Coordinates: 49°58′N 44°06′E
- Country: Russia
- Region: Volgograd Oblast
- District: Frolovsky District
- Time zone: UTC+4:00

Russko-Osinovsky (Russian: Русско-Осиновский) is a rural locality (a khutor) in Dudachenskoye Rural Settlement, Frolovsky District, Volgograd Oblast, Russia. The population was 30 as of 2010.

== Geography ==
Russko-Osinovsky is located 49 km northeast of Prigorodny (the district's administrative centre) by road. Dudachensky is the nearest rural locality.
