= Mansky, Volgograd Oblast =

Mansky Манский
- Khutor
- Location within Volgograd Oblast Location within Russia
- Coordinates: 49°49′N 43°59′E
- Country: Russia
- Region: Volgograd Oblast
- District: Frolovsky District
- Time zone: UTC+4:00

Mansky (Russian: Манский) is a rural locality (a khutor) in Archedinskoye Rural Settlement, Frolovsky District, Volgograd Oblast, Russia. The population was 124 as of 2010.

== Geography ==
Mansky is located on the right bank of the Archeda River, 30 km east of Prigorodny (the district's administrative centre) by road. Obraztsy is the nearest rural locality.
