= Blagodatny =

Blagodatny Благодатный
- Khutor
- Location within Volgograd Oblast Location within Russia
- Coordinates: 49°58′N 43°55′E
- Country: Russia
- Region: Volgograd Oblast
- District: Frolovsky District
- Time zone: UTC+4:00

Blagodatny (Russian: Благодатный) is a rural locality (a khutor) in Lychakskoye Rural Settlement, Frolovsky District, Volgograd Oblast, Russia. The population was counted at 50 people in 2010.

== Geography ==
Blagodatny is located 34 kilometres (21 mi) northeast of Prigorodny (the district's administrative centre) by road. Dudachensky is the nearest rural locality.
