= Prikubansky (rural locality) =

One of several places in Russia

Prikubansky (Russian: Прикуба́нский; masculine), Prikubanskaya (Прикуба́нская; feminine), or Prikubanskoye (Прикуба́нское; neuter) is the name of several rural localities in Russia:

- Prikubansky, Republic of Adygea, a settlement in Takhtamukaysky District of the Republic of Adygea, 44°57′17″N 39°01′44″E
- Prikubansky, Anapsky District, Krasnodar Krai, a khutor in Pervomaysky Rural Okrug of Anapsky District of Krasnodar Krai
- Prikubansky, Krasnoarmeysky District, Krasnodar Krai, a khutor in Novomyshastovsky Rural Okrug of Krasnoarmeysky District of Krasnodar Krai, 45°06′51″N 38°29′55″E
- Prikubansky, Novokubansky District, Krasnodar Krai, a settlement in Prikubansky Rural Okrug of Novokubansky District of Krasnodar Krai, 44°59′54″N 41°10′51″E
- Prikubansky, Anastasiyevsky Rural Okrug, Slavyansky District, Krasnodar Krai, a khutor in Anastasiyevsky Rural Okrug of Slavyansky District of Krasnodar Krai, 45°09′34″N 37°48′18″E
- Prikubansky, Prikubansky Rural Okrug, Slavyansky District, Krasnodar Krai, a khutor in Prikubansky Rural Okrug of Slavyansky District of Krasnodar Krai, 45°09′36″N 38°04′31″E

== See also ==
- Prikubansky (disambiguation)
