= Yablonovskoye Urban Settlement =

Yablonovskoye Urban Settlement is the name of several municipal formations in Russia.

- Yablonovskoye Urban Settlement, a municipal formation which the urban-type settlement of Yablonovsky and two rural localities in Takhtamukaysky District of the Republic of Adygea are incorporated as
- Yablonovskoye Urban Settlement, a municipal formation which the urban-type settlement of Yablonovo and the settlement at the station of Kuka in Chitinsky District of Zabaykalsky Krai are incorporated as

== See also ==
- Yablonovsky (disambiguation)
