= Archedino-Chernushinsky =

Archedino-Chernushinsky Арчедино-Чернушинский
- Khutor
- Location within Volgograd Oblast Location within Russia
- Coordinates: 49°52′N 44°09′E
- Country: Russia
- Region: Volgograd Oblast
- District: Frolovsky District
- Time zone: UTC+4:00

Archedino-Chernushinsky (Russian: Арчедино-Чернушинский) is a rural locality (a khutor) in Archedinskoye Rural Settlement, Frolovsky District, Volgograd Oblast, Russia. The population was 270 as of 2010.

== Geography ==
Archedino-Chernushinsky is located in steppe on east of Frolovsky District, 43 km northeast of Prigorodny (the district's administrative centre) by road. Mansky is the nearest rural locality.
