= Rubyozhny =

Rubyozhny Рубёжный
- Khutor
- Location within Volgograd Oblast Location within Russia
- Coordinates: 49°49′N 44°03′E
- Country: Russia
- Region: Volgograd Oblast
- District: Frolovsky District
- Time zone: UTC+4:00

Rubyozhny (Russian: Рубёжный) is a rural locality (a khutor) in Archedinskoye Rural Settlement, Frolovsky District, Volgograd Oblast, Russia. The population was 222 as of 2010.

== Geography ==
Rubyozhny is located northeast from Obraztsy, 34 km east of Prigorodny (the district's administrative centre) by road. Mansky is the nearest rural locality.
