= Druzhny, Republic of Adygea =

Druzhny Дружный
- Settlement
- Location within Republic of Adygea Location within Russia
- Coordinates: 44°57′N 38°53′E
- Country: Russia
- Region: Adygea
- District: Takhtamukaysky District
- Time zone: UTC+3:00

Druzhny (Russian: Дружный) is a rural locality (a settlement) in Enemskoye Urban Settlement of Takhtamukaysky District, the Republic of Adygea, Russia. The population was 448 as of 2018. There are 2 streets.

== Geography ==
The settlement is located 12 km northwest of Takhtamukay (the district's administrative centre) by road. Enem is the nearest rural locality.
