= Khashtuk =

Khashtuk Хаштук Хьащтыку
- Aul
- Location within Republic of Adygea Location within Russia
- Coordinates: 45°02′N 38°45′E
- Country: Russia
- Region: Adygea
- District: Takhtamukaysky District
- Time zone: UTC+3:00

Khashtuk (Russian: Хаштук; Adyghe: Хьащтыку) is a rural locality (an aul) in Afipsipskoye Rural Settlement of Takhtamukaysky District, the Republic of Adygea, Russia. The population was 269 as of 2018. There are 8 streets.

== Geography ==
The aul is on the left bank of the Kuban River, 35 km northwest of Takhtamukay (the district's administrative centre) by road. Yelizavetinskaya is the nearest rural locality.

== Ethnicity ==
The aul is inhabited by Circassians.
