= Natukhay =

Natukhay Натухай Нэтыхъуай
- Aul
- Location within Republic of Adygea Location within Russia
- Coordinates: 44°51′N 38°59′E
- Country: Russia
- Region: Adygea
- District: Takhtamukaysky District
- Time zone: UTC+3:00

Natukhay (Russian: Натухай; Adyghe: Нэтыхъуай) is a rural locality (an aul) in Takhtamukayskoye Rural Settlement of Takhtamukaysky District, the Republic of Adygea, Russia. The population was 330 as of 2018. There are 10 streets.

== Geography ==
Natukhay is located 10 km south of Takhtamukay (the district's administrative centre) by road. Otradny is the nearest rural locality.

== Ethnicity ==
The aul is inhabited by Natukhajs. This region is known for having the largest number of Natukakji people in the world.
