= Atkarsky District =

Atkarsky District Аткарский район (Russian)
- District
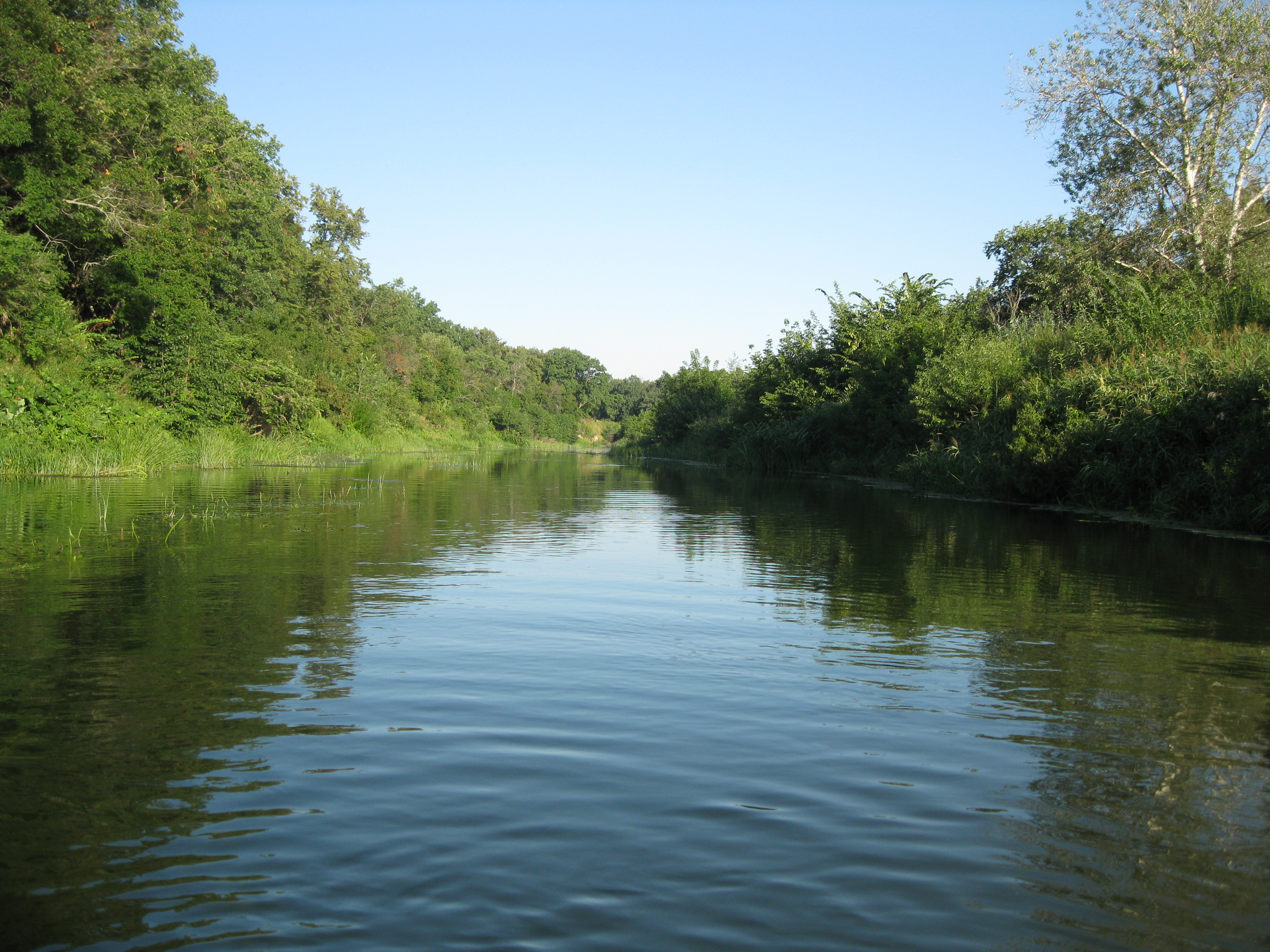
- The Medveditsa River near the selo of Ozernoye in Atkarsky District

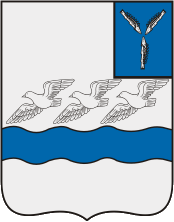
- Flag Coat of arms
- Location of Atkarsky District in Saratov Oblast
- Coordinates: 51°52′N 45°00′E
- Country: Russia
- Federal subject: Saratov Oblast
- Established: 23 July 1928
- Administrative center: Atkarsk

Area
  - Total: 2,700 km^{2} (1,000 sq mi)

Population (2010 Census)
  - Total: 16,550
  - Density: 6.1/km^{2} (16/sq mi)
  - Urban: 0%
  - Rural: 100%

Administrative structure
  - Inhabited localities: 66 rural localities

Municipal structure
  - Municipally incorporated as: Atkarsky Municipal District
  - Municipal divisions: 1 urban settlements, 11 rural settlements
- Time zone: UTC+4 (MSK+1)
- OKTMO ID: 63604000
- Website: http://www.proatkarsk.ru/

Atkarsky District (Russian: Атка́рский райо́н) is an administrative and municipal district (raion), one of the thirty-eight in Saratov Oblast, Russia. It is located in the northwest of the oblast. The area of the district is 2,700 square kilometers (1,000 sq mi). Its administrative center is the town of Atkarsk (which is not administratively a part of the district). Population: 16,550 (2010 Census); 17,915 (2002 census); 16,994 (1989 Soviet census).

== Administrative and municipal status ==
Within the framework of administrative divisions, Atkarsky District is one of the thirty-eight in the oblast. The town of Atkarsk serves as its administrative center, despite being incorporated separately as a town under oblast jurisdiction—an administrative unit with the status equal to that of the districts.

As a municipal division, the district is incorporated as Atkarsky Municipal District, with Atkarsk Town Under Oblast Jurisdiction being incorporated within it as Atkarsk Urban Settlement.
