= Perekatny =

Perekatny Перекатный Чэнджыпӏэ
- Settlement
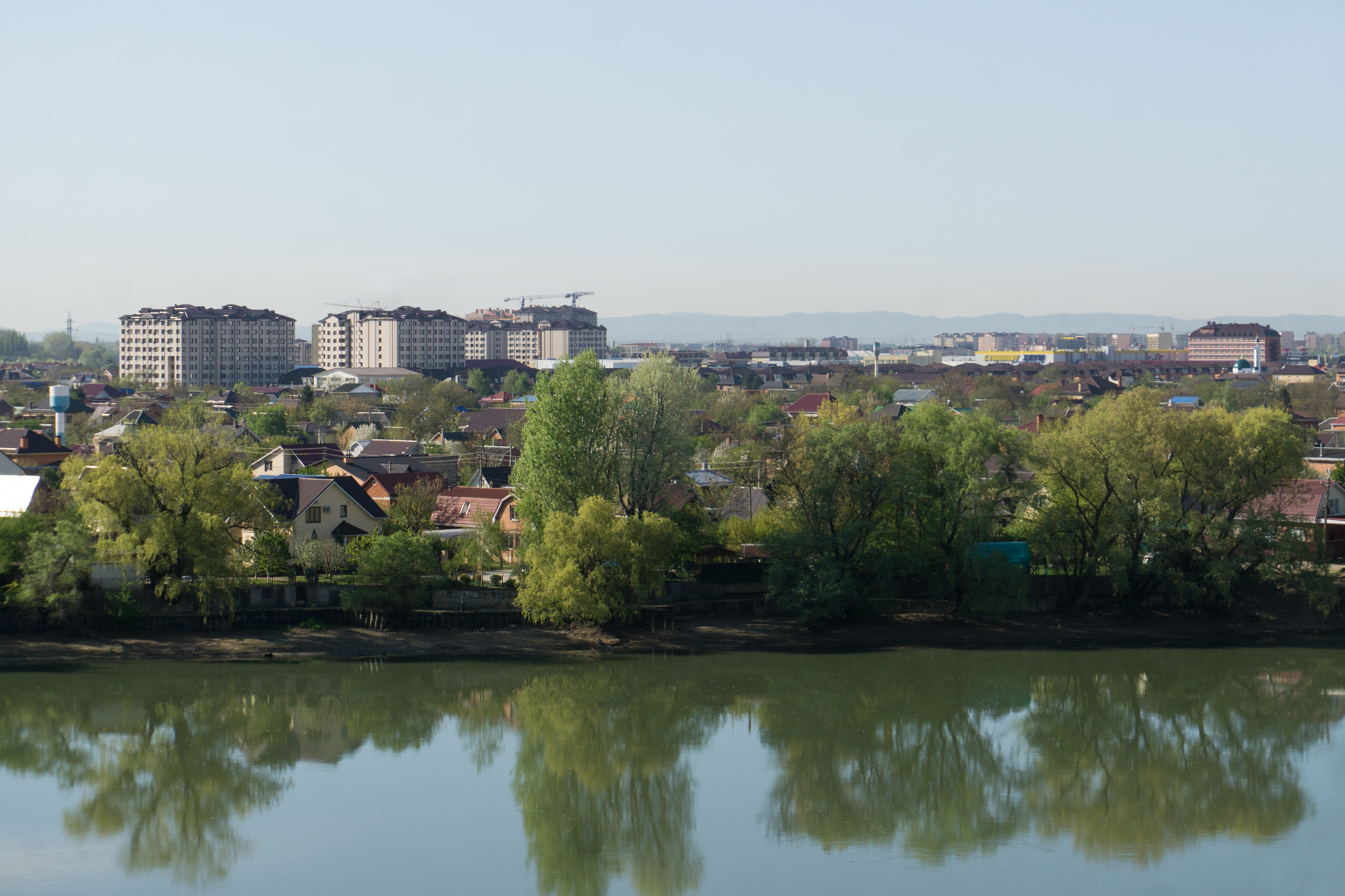
- View of Perekatny taken from Krasnodar

- Location within Republic of Adygea Location within Russia
- Coordinates: 45°01′N 38°57′E
- Country: Russia
- Region: Adygea
- District: Takhtamukaysky District
- Time zone: UTC+3:00

Perekatny (Russian: Перекатный; Adyghe: Чэнджыпӏэ) is a rural locality (a settlement) in Yablonovskoye Rural Settlement of Takhtamukaysky District, the Republic of Adygea, Russia. The population was 238 as of 2018.

== Geography ==
The settlement is located near Krasnodar, 24 km north of Takhtamukay (the district's administrative centre) by road. Novaya Adygeya is the nearest rural locality.
