= Novaya Adygea =

Novaya Adygea Новая Адыгея Пэткэу
- Settlement
- Location within Republic of Adygea Location within Russia
- Coordinates: 45°01′N 38°55′E
- Country: Russia
- Region: Adygea
- District: Takhtamukaysky District
- Time zone: UTC+3:00

Novaya Adygea (Russian: Новая Адыгея, Adyghe: Пэткэу, Pətkəu) is a rural locality (a settlement) in Starobzhegokayskoye Rural Settlement of Takhtamukaysky District, the Republic of Adygea, Russia. The population was 15,133 as of 2023. There are 43 streets.

Historical population
Year	Pop.	±%
2002	764	—
2010	2,051	+168.5%
2021	13,058	+536.7%
Source: Census data

== Geography ==
Novaya Adygea is located 22 km north of Takhtamukay (the district's administrative centre) by road. Perekatny is the nearest rural locality.
