= Novomogilyovsky =

Novomogilyovsky Новомогилёвский Могилевскакӏэр
- Khutor
- Location within Republic of Adygea Location within Russia
- Coordinates: 44°50′N 39°03′E
- Country: Russia
- Region: Adygea
- District: Takhtamukaysky District
- Time zone: UTC+3:00

Novomogilyovsky (Russian: Новомогилёвский; Adyghe: Могилевскакӏэр) is a rural locality (a khutor) in Shendzhyskoye Rural Settlement of Takhtamukaysky District, the Republic of Adygea, Russia. The population was 31 as of 2018. There are 2 streets.

== Geography ==
Novomogilyovsky is located 15 km south of Takhtamukay (the district's administrative centre) by road. Krasnoarmeysky is the nearest rural locality.
