= House of Tletseruk =

Circassian house of privateer origin

House of Tletseruk Тлецерук
- Circassian house of privateer origin
- Country: Circassia (formerly); Russian Empire (formerly); Mountainous Republic of the Northern Caucasus (formerly); Soviet Union (formerly); Russia; Turkey
- Origin: Mytykhuasua (now Plastunka), Ş̂açə, Circassia
- Founded: Unknown
- Traditions: Khabzeism; Sunni Islam

House of Tleseruk (also referred to as Tleseruk) (Russian: Тлецерук, Turkish: Tletseruk/Tleseruk Ailesi) is a Circassian family lineage belonging to the Shapsug tribe of the Adyghe, one of the indigenous peoples of the northwestern Caucasus. Before the Circassian genocide, they lived in the Tuapse region of Krasnodar Krai and the Lazarevsky district of Sochi. Today, the majority of them live in the Pseytuk village of the Republic of Adygea, and in the Aydın, Afyon, İzmir, Çanakkale, Adapazarı, Çorum, Yozgat, Samsun, Balıkesir and Düzce provinces of Turkey.

== Notable members ==
- Mehmed Şemseddin Pasha, vezir of the Ottoman Empire (1855–1917)
- Harun Tletseruk, educator, writer (1879–1938)
- Kim (Kerim) Hamidovich Tletseruk, state artist of the Republic of Adyge (1938–2009)
- Erol Olçok, businessman, advertising consultant (1962–2016)
- Prof. Dr. Sabahattin Özel (1945-...)
- Dr. Selahaddin Anaç (1950-...)

== Images ==
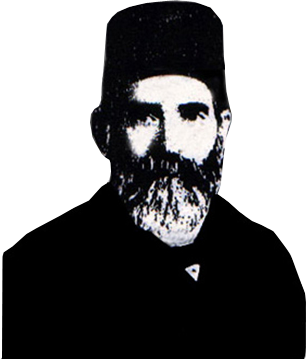
Mehmed Şemseddin Pasha

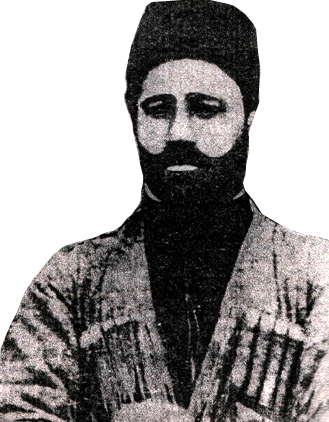
Harun Tletseruk

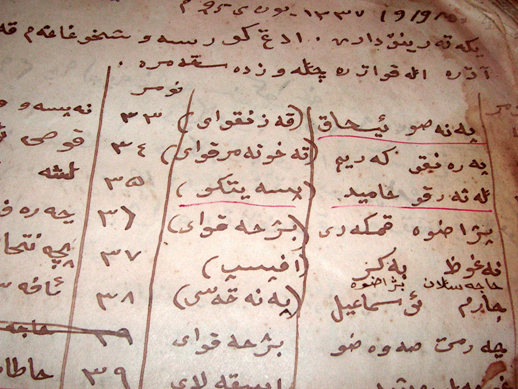
Harun Tletseruk's handwritings
