= Kozet =

Kozet Козет
- Aul

Other transcription(s)
  - Adyghe: Козэт
- Interactive map of Kozet
- Location within Republic of Adygea Location within Russia
- Coordinates: 44°59′N 38°59′E
- Country: Russia
- Federal subject: Adygea
- Founded: 1789
- Elevation: 45 m (148 ft)

Population
  - Estimate (2024): 3,398 )
- Time zone: UTC+3 (MSK)
- Postal code: 385129
- OKTMO ID: 79630417101

Kozet (Russian: Козет; Adyghe: Козэт) is a rural locality (an aul) and the administrative center of Kozetskoye Rural Settlement of Takhtamukaysky District, the Republic of Adygea, Russia. The population was 2203 as of 2018. There are 82 streets.

== Geography ==
The aul is located on the left bank of the Kuban River, 10 km north of Takhtamukay (the district's administrative centre) by road. Novy is the nearest rural locality.

== Ethnicity ==
The aul is inhabited by Adyghes, Russians and Armenians.
