= Kubanstroy =

Kubanstroy Кубаньстрой
- Settlement
- Location within Republic of Adygea Location within Russia
- Coordinates: 44°59′N 38°47′E
- Country: Russia
- Region: Adygea
- District: Takhtamukaysky District
- Time zone: UTC+3:00

Kubanstroy (Russian: Кубаньстрой) is a rural locality (a settlement) in Afipsipskoye Rural Settlement of Takhtamukaysky District, the Republic of Adygea, Russia. The population was 401 as of 2018. There are 3 streets.

== Geography ==
Kubanstroy is located 29 km northwest of Takhtamukay (the district's administrative centre) by road. Afipsip is the nearest rural locality.
