= Apostolidi =

Apostolidi Апостолиди
- Khutor
- Location within Republic of Adygea Location within Russia
- Coordinates: 44°53′N 38°58′E
- Country: Russia
- Region: Adygea
- District: Takhtamukaysky District
- Time zone: UTC+3:00

Apostolidi (Russian: Апостолиди) is a rural locality (a khutor) in Takhtamukayskoye Rural Settlement of Takhtamukaysky District, the Republic of Adygea, Russia. The population was 93 as of 2018. There are 3 streets.

== Geography ==
The khutor is located 7 km southwest of Takhtamukay (the district's administrative centre) by road. Supovsky is the nearest rural locality.

== Ethnicity ==
The khutor is inhabited by Russians and Ukrainians.
