= Staromogilyovsky =

Staromogilyovsky Старомогилёвский Могилевскэжъыр
- Khutor
- Location within Republic of Adygea Location within Russia
- Coordinates: 44°49′N 39°06′E
- Country: Russia
- Region: Adygea
- District: Takhtamukaysky District
- Time zone: UTC+3:00

Staromogilyovsky (Russian: Старомогилёвский; Adyghe: Могилевскэжъыр) is a rural locality (a khutor) in Shendzhyskoye Rural Settlement of Takhtamukaysky District, the Republic of Adygea, Russia. The population was 39 as of 2018. There are 2 streets.

== Geography ==
Staromogilyovsky is located 20 km southeast of Takhtamukay (the district's administrative centre) by road. Novomogilyovsky is the nearest rural locality.
