= Sups =

Sups Супс Шӏупс
- Settlement
- Location within Republic of Adygea Location within Russia
- Coordinates: 44°55′N 38°56′E
- Country: Russia
- Region: Adygea
- District: Takhtamukaysky District
- Time zone: UTC+3:00

Sups (Russian: Супс; Adyghe: Шӏупс) is a rural locality (a settlement) in Takhtamukayskoye Rural Settlement of Takhtamukaysky District, the Republic of Adygea, Russia. The population was 70 as of 2018. There are 3 streets.

== Geography ==
Sups is located 5 km east of Takhtamukay (the district's administrative centre) by road. Enem is the nearest rural locality.
