= Nikolay Cherkasov (disambiguation) =

Nikolay Cherkasov (1903–1966) was a Soviet actor and a People's Artist of the USSR.

Nikolai Cherkasov or Nikolay Cherkasov may also refer to:

- Nikolai Ivanovich Cherkasov, a Hero of the Soviet Union
- Nikolay Cherkasov (cyclist) (born 1996), Russian Gazprom–RusVelo cyclist
