= List of Heroes of the Soviet Union (C) =

The Hero of the Soviet Union was the highest distinction of the Soviet Union. It was awarded 12,775 times. Due to the large size of the list, it has been broken up into multiple pages.

- Fidel Castro
- Ivan Chabunin (ru)
- Frol Chaburin (ru)
- Grigory Chagovets (ru)
- Vasily Chadaykin (ru)
- Aleksei Chaika (ru)
- Fyodor Chaika (ru)
- Yelizaveta Chaikina
- Iosif Chaikovsky (ru)
- Arutyun Chakryan (ru)
- Viktor Chaldayev (ru)
- Valentin Chalenko (ru)
- Yegor Chalov (ru)
- Pavel Chalov (ru)
- Stepan Chalov (ru)
- Aleksandr Chaly (ru)
- Nikolai Chaly (ru)
- Porfiry Chanchibadze
- Nikolai Chapayev (ru)
- Yakov Chapichev (ru)
- Lazar Chapchakhov (ru)
- Timofei Charkov (ru)
- Mikhail Charkov (ru)
- Nikolai Chasnyk (ru)
- Dmitry Chasov (ru)
- Viktor Chvanov (ru)
- Laverenty Chvanov (ru)
- Ivan Cheberko (ru)
- Mikhail Chebodayev (ru)
- Vasily Chebotaryov (ru)
- Vladimir Chebotaryov (ru)
- Dmitry Chebotaryov (ru)
- Mikhail Chebotko (ru)
- Nikifor Chevola (ru)
- Fyodor Chegodayev (ru)
- Kuzma Chekayev (ru)
- Aleksandr Chekalin
- Kuzma Chekal (ru)
- Boris Chekin (ru)
- Yevgraf Chekin (ru)
- Kuzma Chekirov (ru)
- Vasily Chekmasov (ru)
- Grigory Chekmenyov (ru)
- Gordey Chekulayev (ru)
- Nikolai Chelnokov (twice)
- Nikolai Chelov (ru)
- Vasily Chelpanov (ru)
- Dmitry Chelyadinov (ru)
- Vyacheslav Chemodurov (ru)
- Mikhail Chelombitko (ru)
- Arkady Chepelev
- Sergey Chepelyuk (ru)
- Yuri Chepiga (ru)
- Nikolai Chepik (ru)
- Pavel Chepinoga (ru)
- Alfonsas Cheponis (ru)
- Mikhail Dmitrievich Cheprasov (ru)
- Mikhail Maksimovich Cheprasov (ru)
- Grigory Cheprunov (ru)
- Nikita Chepur (ru)
- Anatoly Chepurenko (ru)
- Filipp Chepurin (ru)
- Nikolai Chepurnoy (ru)
- Dmitry Chepusov (ru)
- Logvin Chervony (ru)
- Vladimir Chervyakov (ru)
- Viktor Chergin (ru)
- Aleksei Cherevatenko (ru)
- Ivan Cherevichny (ru)
- Ivan Cherednik (ru)
- Ivan Cherednichenko (ru)
- Leonid Cherednichenko (ru)
- Arkady Cherezov (ru)
- Leonty Cheremnov (ru)
- Yakov Cheremnov (ru)
- Ivan Cheremokhin (ru)
- Aleksandr Cheryomukhin (ru)
- Ivan Cherenkov (ru)
- Vladimir Cherepanov (ru)
- Ivan Cherepanov (ru)
- Kornily Cherepanov (ru)
- Sergey Cherepanov (ru)
- Stepan Cherepanov (ru)
- Sergey Cherepakhin (ru)
- Sergey Cherepnev (ru)
- Gavriil Chereshnev (ru)
- Vladimir Cherinov (ru)
- Lyudvig Cherkas (ru)
- Aleksei Cherkasov (ru)
- Vladimir Cherkasov (ru)
- Mikhail Cherkasov (ru)
- Nikolai Cherkasov (ru)
- Grigory Cherkashin (ru)
- Ivan Cherkashnev (ru)
- Mikhail Chelombitko (ru:Михаил Челомбитько)
- Vladimir Chernavin
- Nikolai Chernavskikh (ru)
- Vasily Ivanovich Chernenko (ru)
- Vasily Fyodorovich Chernenko (ru)
- Nikolai Chernenko (ru)
- Pyotr Chernenko (ru)
- Pavel Chernenok (ru)
- Ivan Chernets (ru)
- Viktor Chernetsov (ru)
- Grigory Chernetsov (ru)
- Georgy Chernienko (ru)
- Andrei Chernikov (ru)
- Grigory Chernikov (ru)
- Ivan Chernikov (ru)
- Mikhail Chernikov (ru)
- Sergey Chernikov (ru)
- Fyodor Chernikov (ru)
- Nikolai Chernichkov (ru)
- Andrei Chernobay (ru)
- Aleksei Chernov (ru)
- Anatoly Chernov (ru)
- Vasily Chernov (ru)
- Viktor Chernov (ru)
- Georgy Gerasimovich Chernov (ru)
- Georgy Nikolayevich Chernov (ru)
- Grigory Chernov (ru)
- Dmitry Vasilyevich Chernov (ru)
- Dmitry Semyonovich Chernov (ru)
- Yevgeny Dmitrievich Chernov (ru)
- Ivan Grigorievich Chernov (ru)
- Ivan Nikiforovich Chernov (ru)
- Ivan Semyonovich Chernov (ru)
- Kirill Chernov (ru)
- Matvei Chernov (ru)
- Mikhail Chernov (ru)
- Pavel Mikhailovich Chernov (ru)
- Fyodor Chernov (ru)
- Ivan Chernovolenko (ru)
- Semyon Chernovsky (ru)
- Sergey Chernovsky (ru)
- Aleksandr Chernozhukov (ru)
- Aleksandr Chernomorets (ru)
- Vladimir Chernomorets (ru)
- Ivan Chernopyatko (ru)
- Georgy Chernopyatov (ru)
- Vasily Chernoshein (ru)
- Ivan Chernukhin (ru)
- Grigory Chyorny (ru)
- Ilya Chyorny (ru)
- Pavel Chyorny (ru)
- Ivan Chernykh (ru)
- Nikolai Andreyevich Chernykh (ru)
- Nikolai Vasilyevich Chernykh (ru)
- Nikolai Innokentevich Chernykh (ru)
- Sergey Chernykh
- Aleksandr Chernysh (ru)
- Pyotr Chernysh (ru)
- Aleksandr Chernyshev (ru)
- Arkady Petrovich Chernyshev (ru)
- Boris Chernyshev (ru)
- Vasily Chernyshev (ru)
- Mikhail Chernyshev (ru)
- Pavel Ivanovich Chernyshev (ru)
- Viktor Chernyshenko (ru)
- Aleksei Chernyshov (ru)
- Sergey Ivanovich Chernyshov (ru)
- Vasily Chernyavsky (ru)
- Aleksei Chernyaev (ru)
- Viktor Chernyaev (ru)
- Ivan Chernyaev (ru)
- Pyotr Chernyaev (ru)
- Afanasy Chernyak (ru)
- Stepan Chernyak (ru)
- Ivan Chernyakhovsky
- Filipp Cherokmanov
- Ivan Chertenkov (ru)
- Anatoly Chertov (ru)
- Andrei Chertsov (ru)
- Pyotr Cheryabkin (ru)
- Iosif Cheryapkin (ru)
- Grigory Chesak (ru)
- Yegor Chesnokov (ru)
- Leonid Chesnokov (ru)
- Nikolai Chesnokov (ru)
- Fyodor Chesnokov (ru)
- Aleksei Chetvyortkin (ru)
- Mikhail Chetvertnoy (ru)
- Aleksei Chetonov (ru)
- Grigory Chekh (ru)
- Gennady Chekhlov (ru)
- Ivan Chekhov (ru)
- Otari Chechelashvili (ru)
- Mikhail Chechenev (ru)
- Nikolai Chechetko (ru)
- Marina Chechneva
- Vladimir Ilyich Chechulin (ru)
- Ivan Chechulin (ru)
- Nikolai Chechulin (ru)
- Ivan Cheshcharin (ru)
- Konon Chibisov (ru)
- Nikandr Chibisov
- Yuri Chibisov (ru)
- Pyotr Chigadayev (ru)
- Leonid Chigin
- Sergo Chigladze (ru)
- Grigory Chigrin (ru)
- Nikolai Chizhenkov (ru)
- Filipp Chizhikov (ru)
- Vasily Chizhov (ru)
- Sergey Chizhov (ru)
- Aleksei Chikin (ru)
- Vakhtang Chikovani (ru)
- Nikolai Chikurov (ru)
- Shalva Chilachava (ru)
- Ivan Chilikin (ru)
- Artur Chilingarov
- Saribek Chilingarin (ru)
- Nikolai Chinin (ru)
- Anatoly Chinkov (ru)
- Vasily Chipishev (ru)
- Nikolai Chirka (ru)
- Pavel Chirkin (ru)
- Aleksandr Chirkov (ru)
- Andrei Chirkov (ru)
- Mikhail Chirkov (ru)
- Semyon Chirkov (ru)
- Fyodor Chirkov (ru)
- Aleksandr Chislov (ru)
- Boris Chistov (ru)
- Ivan Chistov (ru)
- Konstantin Chistov (ru)
- Nikolai Chistov (ru)
- Aleksandr Fyodorovich Chistyakov (ru)
- Vasily Chistyakov (pilot) (ru)
- Vasily Chistyakov (soldier) (ru)
- Viktor Feofanovich Chistyakov (ru)
- Yevgeny Chistyakov (ru)
- Ivan Chistyakov
- Maksim Andreyevich Chistyakov (ru)
- Mikhail Chistyakov (ru)
- Mikhail Chitalin (ru)
- Nikolai Chikharev (ru)
- Nikolai Chichikalo (ru)
- Fyodor Chichkan (ru)
- Pyotr Chiyanev (ru)
- Valery Chkalov
- Igor Chmurov (ru)
- Nikolai Chmyrenko (ru)
- Konstantin Cholovsky (ru)
- Anvarbek Chortekov (ru)
- Vasily Chochiev (ru)
- Jean-Loup Chrétien
- Aleksei Chubarov (ru)
- Mikhail Chubarykh (ru)
- Dmitry Chubar (ru)
- Levan Chubinidze (ru)
- Semyon Chubukov (ru)
- Fyodor Chubukov
- Nikita Chuvakov (ru)
- Nikolai Chuvin (ru)
- Anatoly Chugayev (ru)
- Leonid Chuguevsky (ru)
- Mikhail Chugunin (ru)
- Viktor Chugunov (ru)
- Ivan Chugunov (ru)
- Vladimir Chudaykin (ru)
- Leonid Chudbin (ru)
- Pyotr Chudinov (ru)
- Stepan Chudinov (ru)
- Pyotr Chuenko (ru)
- Vasily Chuikov
- Yegor Chuikov (ru)
- Illarion Chulichkin (ru)
- Aleksei Chulkov (ru)
- Ivan Chulkov (ru)
- Grigory Chumayev (ru)
- Vladimir Chumak (ru)
- Dmitry Chumak (ru)
- Pavel Chumak (ru)
- Andrei Chumakov (ru)
- Grigory Chumakov (ru)
- Viktor Chumachenko (ru)
- Vladimir Chumachenko (ru)
- Dmitry Chumachenko (ru)
- Afanasy Chumov (ru)
- Nikolai Chuntonov (ru)
- Pavel Chupikov (ru)
- Ivan Chupilko (ru)
- Mikhail Chupilko (ru)
- Aleksei Chupin (ru)
- Grigory Chuprina (ru)
- Aleksandr Chuprov (ru)
- Nikolai Churikov (ru)
- Aleksei Churilin (ru)
- Arseny Churilin (ru)
- Leonid Churilov (ru)
- Yuri Churilov (ru)
- Vasily Churkin (ru)
- Ivan Churochkin (ru)
- Ivan Chursanov (ru)
- Mikhail Chursin (ru)
- Vasily Churyumov (ru)
- Nikolai Chusovsky (ru)
- Dementy Chuta (ru)
- Aleksandr Chukharev (ru)
- Vyacheslav Chukharev (ru)
- Viktor Chukhnakov (ru)
- Nikolai Chukhreyev (ru)
- Abubachir Chuts (ru)
- Ivan Chuchvaga (ru)
- Vladimir Chkhaidze (ru)
- Sergey Chkhaidze (ru)
