= Novobzhegokay =

Novobzhegokay Новобжегокай (Russian) БжыхьэкъоякI (Adyghe)
- Aul
- Location within Republic of Adygea Location within Russia
- Coordinates: 44°55′N 38°50′E
- Country: Russia
- Region: Adygea
- District: Takhtamukaysky District

Population (2021)
  - Total: 420
- Time zone: UTC+3:00

Novobzhegokay (Russian: Новобжегокай; Adyghe: БжыхьэкъоякI, romanized: Bžyḥeqoyakʼ) is a rural locality (an aul) in Enemskoye Urban Settlement of Takhtamukaysky District, the Republic of Adygea, Russia. The population was 420 as of 2021, an increase from 381 in 2018. There are 5 streets.

== Geography ==
The aul located on the right bank of the Afipse River, 16 km west of Takhtamukay (the district's administrative centre) by road. Afipsky is the nearest rural locality.

== Demographics ==
According to the 2021 Russian census, out of the 420 residents, 392 identified as indigenous Circassians (Adyghes), 22 identified as Russian, and 6 others identified as another ethnicity or did not identify.
