= Pseytuk =

Pseytuk Псейтук Псэйтыку
- Aul
- Location within Republic of Adygea Location within Russia
- Coordinates: 45°03′N 38°42′E
- Country: Russia
- Region: Adygea
- District: Takhtamukaysky District
- Time zone: UTC+3:00

Pseytuk (Russian: Псейтук; Adyghe: Псэйтыку) is a rural locality (an aul) in Afipsipskoye Rural Settlement of Takhtamukaysky District, the Republic of Adygea, Russia. The population was 630 as of 2018. There are 31 streets.

== Geography ==
The aul is located on the left bank of the Kuban River, 46 km northwest of Takhtamukay (the district's administrative centre) by road. Stefanovsky is the nearest rural locality.

== Ethnicity ==
The aul is inhabited by Adyghes.

== Notable people ==
- Murat Akhedzhak (1962–2010), politician, Deputy Head of Administration of Krasnodar Krai
