= Yablonovsky (inhabited locality) =

Yablonovsky (Russian: Яблоновский; masculine), Yablonovskaya (Яблоновская; feminine), or Yablonovskoye (Яблоновское; neuter) is the name of several inhabited localities in Russia.

Urban localities

- Yablonovsky, Republic of Adygea, an urban-type settlement in Takhtamukaysky District of the Republic of Adygea

Rural localities

- Yablonovsky, Rostov Oblast, a settlement in Krasnozorinskoye Rural Settlement of Bokovsky District of Rostov Oblast
