= Starobzhegokay =

Starobzhegokay Старобжегокай Бжыхьэкъоежъ
- Aul
- Location within Republic of Adygea Location within Russia
- Coordinates: 45°02′N 38°53′E
- Country: Russia
- Region: Adygea
- District: Takhtamukaysky District
- Time zone: UTC+3:00

Starobzhegokay (Russian: Старобжегокай; Adyghe: Бжыхьэкъоежъ) is a rural locality (an aul) and the administrative center of Starobzhegokayskoye Rural Settlement of Takhtamukaysky District, the Republic of Adygea, Russia. The population was 2509 as of 2018. There are 79 streets.

== Geography ==
The aul is located on the bank of the Kuban River, 25 km north of Takhtamukay (the district's administrative centre) by road. Novaya Adygeya is the nearest rural locality.

== Ethnicity ==
The aul is inhabited by Circassians.
