= Otradny, Takhtamukaysky District, Republic of Adygea =

Otradny Отрадный Гушӏуагъо
- Settlement
- Location within Republic of Adygea Location within Russia
- Coordinates: 44°52′N 38°57′E
- Country: Russia
- Region: Adygea
- District: Takhtamukaysky District
- Time zone: UTC+3:00

Otradny (Russian: Отра́дный; Adyghe: Гушӏуагъо) is a rural locality (a settlement) in Takhtamukayskoye Rural Settlement of Takhtamukaysky District, the Republic of Adygea, Russia. The population was 671 as of 2018. There are 6 streets.

== Geography ==
Otradny is located 9 km southwest of Takhtamukay (the district's administrative centre) by road. Natukhay is the nearest rural locality.
