= Novy, Takhtamukaysky District, Republic of Adygea =

Novy Новый ГъэпсыгъакI
- Settlement
- Location within Republic of Adygea Location within Russia
- Coordinates: 45°00′N 38°58′E
- Country: Russia
- Region: Adygea
- District: Takhtamukaysky District
- Time zone: UTC+3:00

Novy (Russian: Новый; Adyghe: ГъэпсыгъакI) is a rural locality (a settlement) in Yablonovskoye Rural Settlement of Takhtamukaysky District, the Republic of Adygea, Russia. The population was 2173 as of 2018. There are 21 streets.

== Geography ==
The settlement is located on the left bank of the Kuban River, 12 km north of Takhtamukay (the district's administrative centre) by road. Kozet is the nearest rural locality.
