= Shendzhy =

Shendzhy Шенджий Щынджый
- Aul
- Location within Republic of Adygea Location within Russia
- Coordinates: 44°52′N 39°03′E
- Country: Russia
- Region: Adygea
- District: Takhtamukaysky District
- Time zone: UTC+3:00

Shendzhy (Russian: Ше́нджий; Adyghe: Щынджый) is a rural locality (an aul) and the administrative center of Shendzhyskoye Rural Settlement of Takhtamukaysky District, the Republic of Adygea, Russia. The population was 1942 as of 2018. There are 33 streets.

== Geography ==
Shendzhy is located 9 km (5.6 mi) southeast of Takhtamukay (the district's administrative centre) by road. Krasnoarmeysky is the nearest rural locality.

== Ethnicity ==
The aul is inhabited by Circassians.
