= Yablonovsky =

Yablonovsky (masculine), Yablonovskaya (feminine), or Yablonovskoye (neuter) may refer to:

- Yablonovskoye Urban Settlement, several municipal urban settlements in Russia
- Yablonovsky (inhabited locality), several inhabited localities in Russia

== See also ==
- Jabłonowski
