= Novy Sad =

Novy Sad Новый Сад
- Khutor
- Location within Republic of Adygea Location within Russia
- Coordinates: 44°54′N 38°54′E
- Country: Russia
- Region: Adygea
- District: Takhtamukaysky District
- Time zone: UTC+3:00

Novy Sad (Russian: Новый Сад) is a rural locality (a khutor) in Enemskoye Urban Settlement of Takhtamukaysky District, the Republic of Adygea, Russia. The population was 1337 as of 2018. There are 13 streets.

== Geography ==
The khutor is located near Enem, 14 km west of Takhtamukay (the district's administrative centre) by road. Enem is the nearest rural locality.
