= Belanda =

Belanda may refer to any of the following:

== Africa-related topics ==
- The Belanda Bor people (a.k.a. Belenda Bor or Boor), an ethnic group in South Sudan
- The languages they speak:
  - Belanda Bor language, a Luo language
  - Belanda Viri language, a Ubangian language

== Asia-related topics ==
"Belanda", a word in Indonesian languages borrowed from Portuguese Holanda, 'Holland', which is used pars pro toto to refer to the Netherlands, and more generally, European-descended and -related people and things:

=== People ===
- Belanda Hitam, lit. 'Black Dutchmen', Black soldiers and agents employed by the Dutch colonial empire
- Indo people (a.k.a. Belanda–Indo), Eurasian people living in or connected with Indonesia
- "Londo" (slur), an ethnic slur derived from Belanda

=== Places ===
- The Dutch East Indies (Indonesian: Hindia-Belanda), the Dutch colonial period in Indonesia
- Dutch New Guinea (Nugini Belanda), the western part of New Guinea, which remained under Dutch rule until 1962
- Ancol War Cemetery (Makam Kehormatan Belanda di Ancol), a war cemetery in Ancol, Jakarta, Indonesia
- Pandu War Cemetery (Makam Kehormatan Belanda di Pandu), a war cemetery in Bandung, West Java, Indonesia
- Dutch Fort (Kota Belanda), a ruined fort in Perak, Malaysia
- Dutch Graveyard (Kubur Belanda), a cemetery in Malacca City, Malaysia

=== Food ===
- Kue semprong (a.k.a. kue Belanda), an Indonesian wafer snack
- Tamarillo (a.k.a. terong Belanda, 'Dutch eggplant'), a flowering plant in the nightshade family

== See also ==
- Balanda (disambiguation)
- Blanda
- Beland (disambiguation)
- Balunda
- Holland (disambiguation)
