= Archeda railway station =

Railway station in Frolovo, Russia

Coordinates: 49.7647°N 43.6548°E

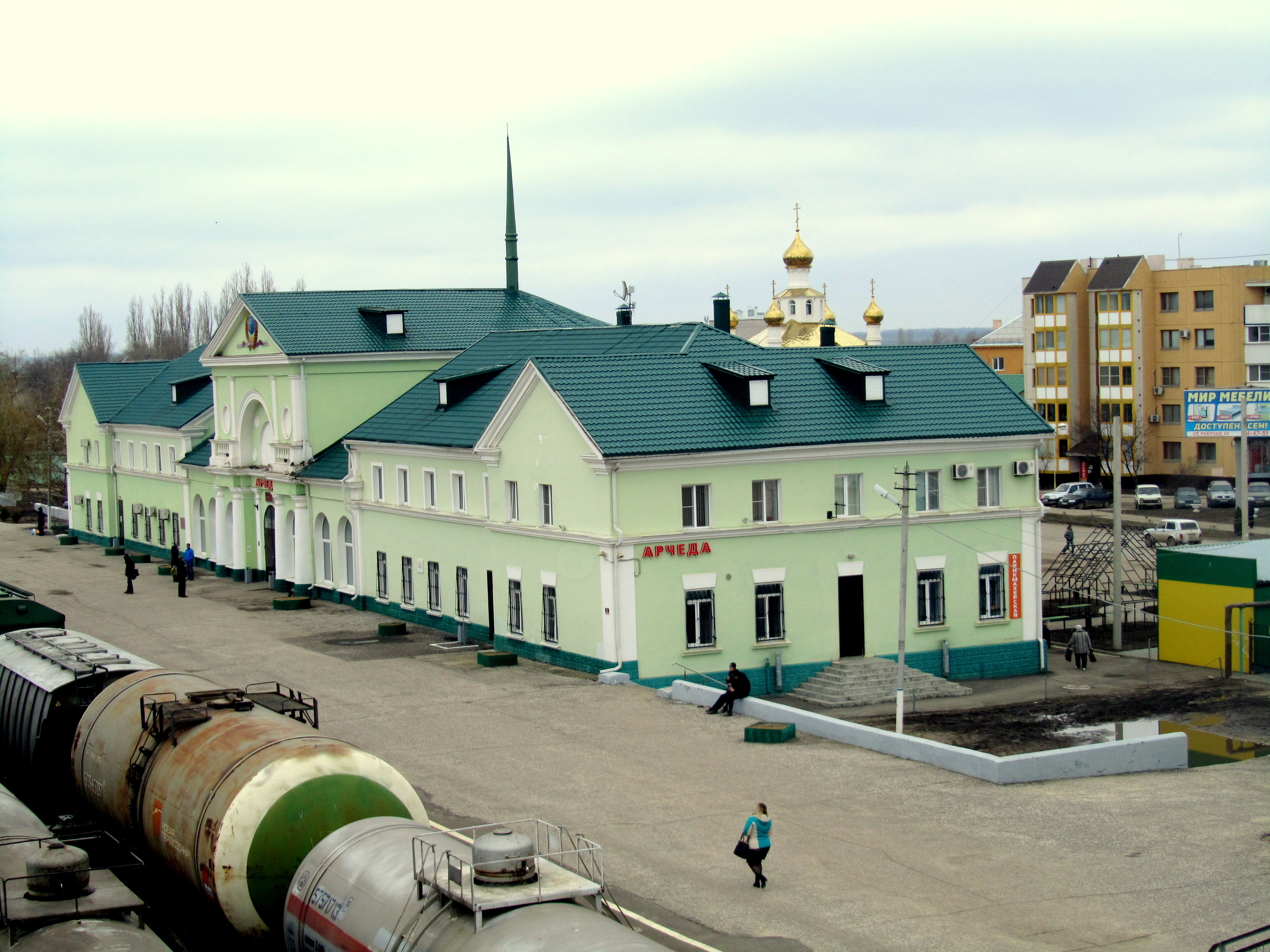
Archeda railway station in 2016

Archeda railway station is a railway station in Frolovo, Volgograd Oblast, Russia.

== History ==
=== Establishment under the Russian Empire ===
A second-class station appeared near the Lyzhinsky farm (and two kilometers from the Frolova farm) in connection with the construction of the Gryaze-Tsaritsyn railway in 1868–1871 on the territory of the Don Host Oblast. Initially, the station was called Mikhailo-Chertkovo in honor of the acting ataman of the Don Army from 1874 to 1881, Lieutenant General Mikhail Chertkov. The station had a train station, a water pumping station, and a large locomotive depot. In 1875, it received a new name after the nearby Archeda river.

=== Russo-Ukrainian war ===
On 4 August 2025, the station was set on fire. The fire was suspected to have been caused by a crashed drone.

== See also ==
- List of railway stations
