= Khomuty =

Khomuty Хомуты
- Khutor
- Location within Republic of Adygea Location within Russia
- Coordinates: 44°59′N 38°52′E
- Country: Russia
- Region: Adygea
- District: Takhtamukaysky District
- Time zone: UTC+3:00

Khomuty (Russian: Хомуты) is a rural locality (a khutor) in Starobzhegokayskoye Rural Settlement of Takhtamukaysky District, the Republic of Adygea, Russia. The population was 609 as of 2018. There are 22 streets.

== Geography ==
Khomuty is located 22 km northwest of Takhtamukay (the district's administrative centre) by road. Yablonovsky is the nearest rural locality.
