= Krasnoarmeysky, Republic of Adygea =

Krasnoarmeysky Красноармейский Дзэплъыжь
- Khutor
- Location within Republic of Adygea Location within Russia
- Coordinates: 44°50′N 39°02′E
- Country: Russia
- Region: Adygea
- District: Takhtamukaysky District
- Time zone: UTC+3:00

Krasnoarmeysky (Russian: Красноармейский; Adyghe: Дзэплъыжь) is a rural locality (a khutor) in Shendzhyskoye Rural Settlement of Takhtamukaysky District, the Republic of Adygea, Russia. The population was 46 as of 2018. There are 2 streets.

== Geography ==
Krasnoarmeysky is located 14 km southeast of Takhtamukay (the district's administrative centre) by road. Novomogilyovsky is the nearest rural locality.
