= Atkarsk =

Town in Saratov Oblast, Russia

Atkarsk Аткарск
- Town
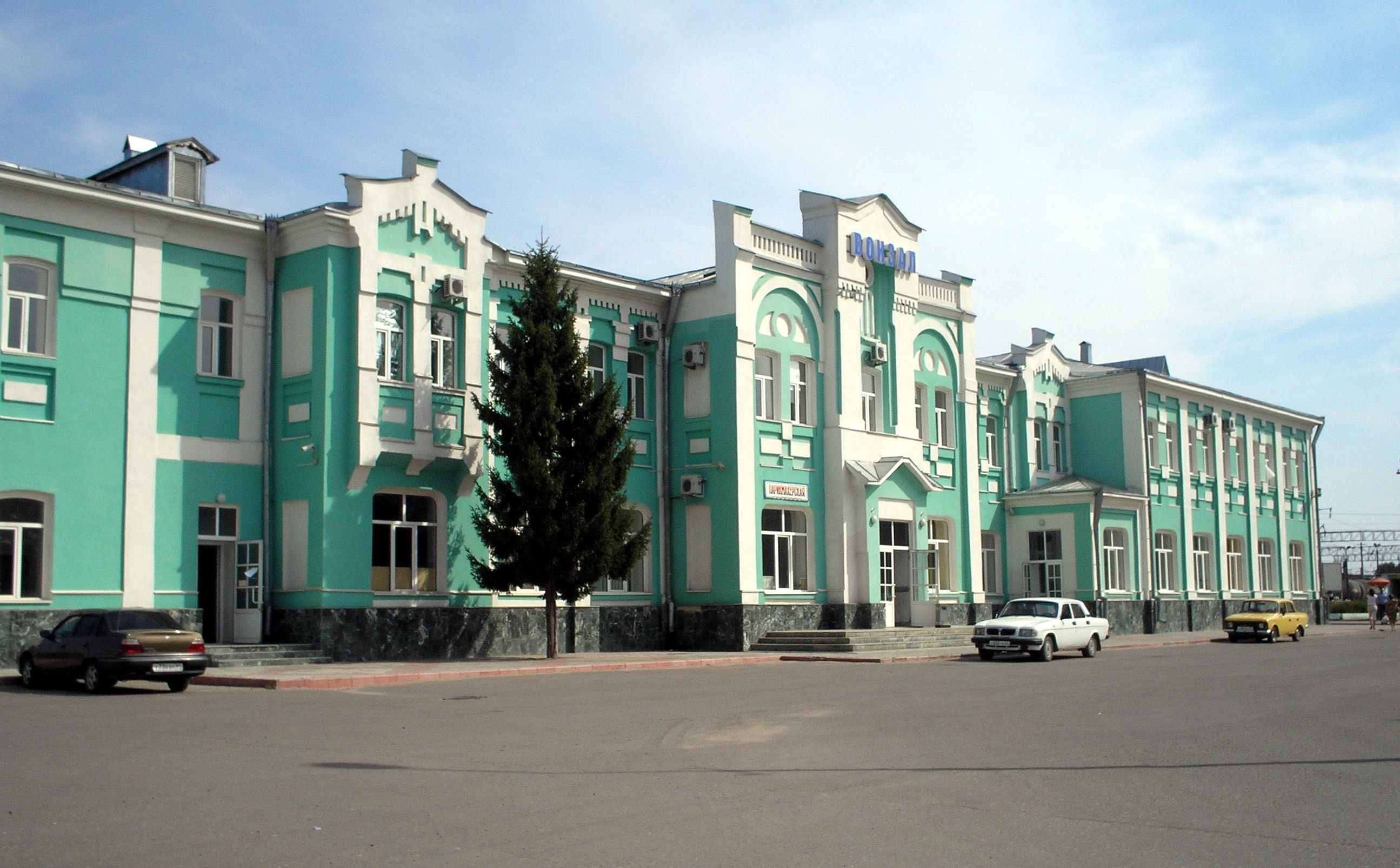
- Atkarsk railway station

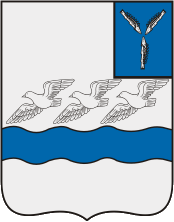
- Flag Coat of arms
- Interactive map of Atkarsk
- Location of Atkarsk Atkarsk (Saratov Oblast)
- Coordinates: 51°52′N 45°00′E
- Country: Russia
- Federal subject: Saratov Oblast
- Founded: 18th century
- Town status since: 1781
- Elevation: 167 m (548 ft)

Population (2010 Census)
  - Total: 25,624
  - Estimate (2021): 22,709 (−11.4%)

Administrative status
  - Subordinated to: Atkarsk Town Under Oblast Jurisdiction
  - Capital of: Atkarsky District, Atkarsk Town Under Oblast Jurisdiction

Municipal status
  - Municipal district: Atkarsky Municipal District
  - Urban settlement: Atkarsk Urban Settlement
  - Capital of: Atkarsky Municipal District, Atkarsk Urban Settlement
- Time zone: UTC+4 (MSK+1)
- Postal codes: 412420, 412421, 412423–412425
- Dialing code: +7 84552
- OKTMO ID: 63604101001

Atkarsk (Russian: Атка́рск) is a town in Saratov Oblast, Russia, located at the confluence of the Atkara and Medveditsa Rivers, 92 kilometers (57 mi) northwest of Saratov, the administrative center of the oblast. Population: 25,624 (2010 census); 27,907 (2002 census); 28,877 (1989 Soviet census).

== History ==
It was founded in place of a Tatar settlement at the mouth of the Atkara River. Town status was granted to it in 1781.

== Administrative and municipal status ==
Within the framework of administrative divisions, Atkarsk serves as the administrative center of Atkarsky District, even though it is not a part of it. As an administrative division, it is incorporated separately as Atkarsk Town Under Oblast Jurisdiction—an administrative unit with the status equal to that of the districts. As a municipal division, Atkarsk Town Under Oblast Jurisdiction is incorporated within Atkarsky Municipal District as Atkarsk Urban Settlement.

== Notable people ==
Russian pop singer Valeriya was born here in 1968.
