= Krasnoarmeysky =

Krasnoarmeysky (masculine), Krasnoarmeyskaya (feminine), or Krasnoarmeyskoye (neuter) may refer to:

- Krasnoarmeysky District, name of several districts in the countries of the former Soviet Union
- Krasnoarmeysky (inhabited locality) (Krasnoarmeyskaya, Krasnoarmeyskoye), name of several inhabited localities in Russia
