= Prikubansky =

Prikubansky (masculine), Prikubanskaya (feminine), or Prikubanskoye (neuter) may refer to:

- Prikubansky District, Karachay-Cherkess Republic, a district of the Karachay-Cherkess Republic, Russia
- Prikubansky (rural locality), name of several rural localities in Russia
- Prikubansky Okrug, an administrative division of the city of Krasnodar, Krasnodar Krai, Russia
