= Afipsip =

Afipsip Афипсип (Russian) Афыпсып (Adyghe)
- Aul
- Location within Republic of Adygea Location within Russia
- Coordinates: 44°59′N 38°46′E
- Country: Russia
- Region: Adygea
- District: Takhtamukaysky District

Population (2021)
  - Total: 2,133
- Time zone: UTC+3:00

Afipsip (Russian: Афипсип; Adyghe: Афыпсып, romanized: Afəpsəp) is a rural locality (an aul) and the administrative center of Afipsipskoye Rural Settlement of Takhtamukaysky District, the Republic of Adygea, Russia. The population was 2,133 as of 2021. There are 35 streets.

== Geography ==
The aul is located on the shore of the Shapsug water reservoir of the Afips River, 31 km northwest of Takhtamukay (the district's administrative centre) by road. Kubanstroy is the nearest rural locality.

== Demographics ==
According to the 2021 Russian census, the population of Afipsip is 2,133—a decline from 2,193 in 2018. Out of the total population, 1,610 identified as indigenous Circassians (Adyghes), 386 identified as Russians, and 137 identified as either a different ethnicity or did not specify.
