= Krasnoarmeysky District =

Krasnoarmeysky District may refer to:

- Krasnoarmeysky District, Russia, name of several districts and city districts in Russia
- Krasnoarmeysky District, former name of Taiynsha District, Kazakhstan
- Krasnoarmiisk Raion (Krasnoarmeysky District), former name of Pokrovsk Raion, Ukraine
