= Frolovo =

Town in Volgograd Oblast, Russia

Frolovo Фролово
- Town
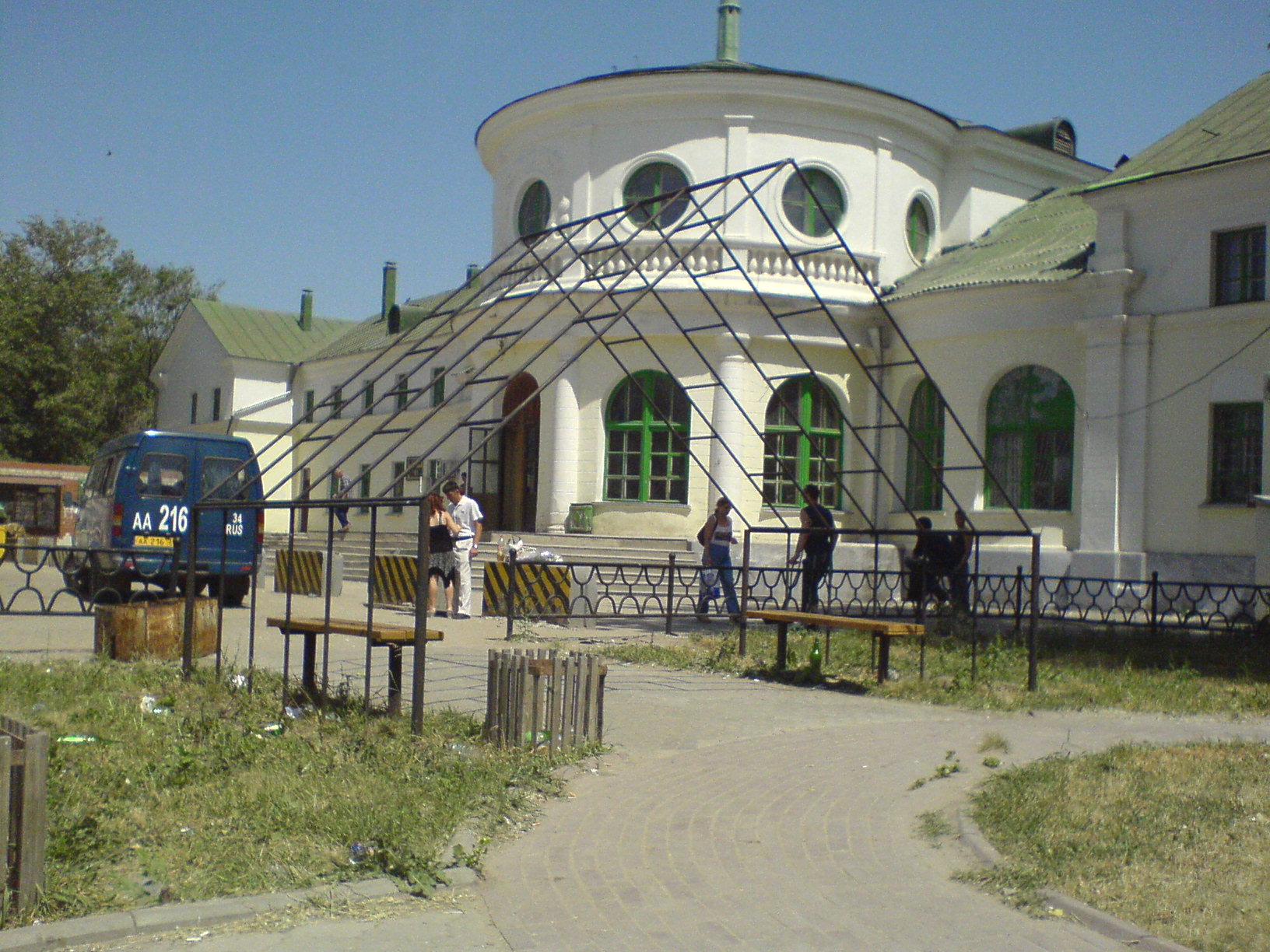
- Frolovo railway and bus station

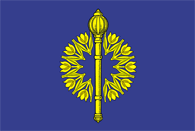
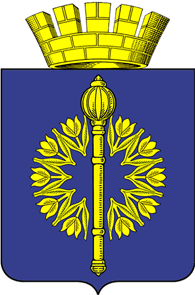
- Flag Coat of arms
- Interactive map of Frolovo
- Location of Frolovo Frolovo (Volgograd Oblast)
- Coordinates: 49°45′57″N 43°38′57″E
- Country: Russia
- Federal subject: Volgograd Oblast
- Founded: 1868
- Town status since: 1936
- Elevation: 110 m (360 ft)

Population (2010 Census)
  - Total: 39,449
  - Estimate (2025): 33,933 (−14%)

Administrative status
  - Subordinated to: town of oblast significance of Frolovo
  - Capital of: Frolovsky District, town of oblast significance of Frolovo

Municipal status
  - Urban okrug: Frolovo Urban Okrug
  - Capital of: Frolovo Urban Okrug
- Time zone: UTC+3 (MSK)
- Postal codes: 403530–403536, 403538, 403540, 403541
- OKTMO ID: 18728000001
- Website: городфролово.рф

Frolovo (Russian: Фро́лово) is a town in Volgograd Oblast, Russia, located on the Archeda River (Don's basin), 148 kilometers (92 mi) north of Volgograd, the administrative center of the oblast. Population: 39,449 (2010 census); 41,132 (2002 census); 41,680 (1989 Soviet census).

== History ==
Frolovo grew out of the Cossack settlement of Frolov. The first written mention of the Frolov settlement was in 1859. At that time there were 22 yards in the settlement, 236 people lived there.

In 1868, construction the Gryazi–Povorino–Tsaritsyn railroad began, which passed near the settlement. In 1870, the Archeda railway station was founded, and the locomotive depot was opened.

It was granted town status in 1936.

== Administrative and municipal status ==
Within the framework of administrative divisions, Frolovo serves as the administrative center of Frolovsky District, even though it is not a part of it. As an administrative division, it is incorporated separately as the town of oblast significance of Frolovo—an administrative unit with the status equal to that of the districts. As a municipal division, the town of oblast significance of Frolovo is incorporated as Frolovo Urban Okrug.

== Transport ==
- Archeda railway station

== Climate ==
Climate data for Frolovo (extremes 1936-present)
Month	Jan	Feb	Mar	Apr	May	Jun	Jul	Aug	Sep	Oct	Nov	Dec	Year
Record high °C (°F)	13.2 (55.8)	13.9 (57.0)	23.1 (73.6)	31.5 (88.7)	37.9 (100.2)	40.7 (105.3)	41.8 (107.2)	41.4 (106.5)	37.1 (98.8)	30.8 (87.4)	20.9 (69.6)	12.3 (54.1)	41.8 (107.2)
Mean daily maximum °C (°F)	−3.5 (25.7)	−2.7 (27.1)	4.1 (39.4)	15.6 (60.1)	23.2 (73.8)	27.7 (81.9)	30.1 (86.2)	29.4 (84.9)	22.1 (71.8)	13.3 (55.9)	3.7 (38.7)	−1.9 (28.6)	13.4 (56.2)
Daily mean °C (°F)	−6.5 (20.3)	−6.4 (20.5)	−0.4 (31.3)	9.3 (48.7)	16.4 (61.5)	20.9 (69.6)	23.2 (73.8)	22.0 (71.6)	15.3 (59.5)	8.0 (46.4)	0.3 (32.5)	−4.7 (23.5)	8.1 (46.6)
Mean daily minimum °C (°F)	−9.4 (15.1)	−9.7 (14.5)	−4.0 (24.8)	3.8 (38.8)	9.9 (49.8)	14.3 (57.7)	16.5 (61.7)	15.0 (59.0)	9.3 (48.7)	3.8 (38.8)	−2.4 (27.7)	−7.3 (18.9)	3.3 (38.0)
Record low °C (°F)	−36.6 (−33.9)	−37.5 (−35.5)	−33.5 (−28.3)	−16.1 (3.0)	−4.7 (23.5)	1.6 (34.9)	6.3 (43.3)	1.9 (35.4)	−5.4 (22.3)	−13.4 (7.9)	−27.7 (−17.9)	−31.5 (−24.7)	−37.5 (−35.5)
Average precipitation mm (inches)	41.7 (1.64)	35.1 (1.38)	33.1 (1.30)	31.1 (1.22)	45.6 (1.80)	41.3 (1.63)	38.3 (1.51)	24.3 (0.96)	37.9 (1.49)	36.0 (1.42)	33.9 (1.33)	42.1 (1.66)	440.4 (17.34)
Source: pogoda.ru.net
