= Kalininsk, Saratov Oblast =

Town in Saratov Oblast, Russia

Kalininsk Калининск
- Town
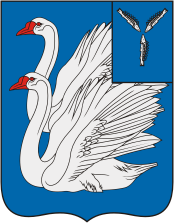
- Coat of arms
- Interactive map of Kalininsk
- Location of Kalininsk Kalininsk (Saratov Oblast)
- Coordinates: 51°30′N 44°28′E
- Country: Russia
- Federal subject: Saratov Oblast
- Administrative district: Kalininsky District
- Founded: 1680
- Town status since: 1962
- Elevation: 150 m (490 ft)

Population (2010 Census)
  - Total: 16,441
  - Estimate (2021): 14,949 (−9.1%)

Administrative status
  - Capital of: Kalininsky District

Municipal status
  - Municipal district: Kalininsky Municipal District
  - Urban settlement: Kalininsk Urban Settlement
  - Capital of: Kalininsky Municipal District, Kalininsk Urban Settlement
- Time zone: UTC+4 (MSK+1)
- Postal code: 412480–412484
- Dialing code: +7 84549
- OKTMO ID: 63621101001

Kalininsk (Russian: Кали́нинск) is a town and the administrative center of Kalininsky District in Saratov Oblast, Russia, located on the Balanda River (Medveditsa's tributary), 121 kilometers (75 mi) west of Saratov, the administrative center of the oblast. Population: 16,441 (2010 census); 18,855 (2002 census); 19,347 (1989 Soviet census)..

== History ==
It was founded in 1680 as the village of Balanda (Бала́нда), named so after the Balanda River, whose name in turn is possibly derived from a dialectal word indicating the river's windiness. In 1962, Balanda was granted town status and renamed Kalininsk after Mikhail Kalinin, a Bolshevik revolutionary and Soviet politician.

== Administrative and municipal status ==
Within the framework of administrative divisions, Kalininsk serves as the administrative center of Kalininsky District, to which it is directly subordinated. As a municipal division, the town of Kalininsk is incorporated within Kalininsky Municipal District as Kalininsk Urban Settlement.
