= Prikubansky, Republic of Adygea =

Prikubansky Прикубанский Пшызэӏушъу
- Settlement
- Location within Republic of Adygea Location within Russia
- Coordinates: 44°57′N 39°01′E
- Country: Russia
- Region: Adygea
- District: Takhtamukaysky District
- Time zone: UTC+3:00

Prikubansky (Russian: Прикубанский; Adyghe: Пшызэӏушъу) is a rural locality (a settlement) in Takhtamukayskoye Rural Settlement of Takhtamukaysky District, the Republic of Adygea, Russia. The population was 1126 as of 2018. There are 9 streets.

== Geography ==
Prikubansky is located 9 km northeast of Takhtamukay (the district's administrative centre) by road. Takhtamukay is the nearest rural locality.
