= Murat Akhedzhak =

Russian politician (1962–2010)

Murat Kazbekovich Akhedzhak (Russian: Мура́т Казбе́кович Ахеджа́к; July 18, 1962, village Pseytuk, Takhtamukaysky District, Adyghe Autonomous Oblast, Krasnodar Krai, USSR — December 7, 2010, Freiburg, Germany) was a Deputy Head of Administration of Krasnodar Krai in the 2002–2010. He was awarded Hero of Labor of Kuban medal (posthumously).

He came from a princely family Akhedzhakov's. He graduated from Kuban State Technological University on speciality civil engineer (1983). Candidate of Technical Sciences.

In May 2005, he was urgently hospitalized in a Krasnodar hospital with the diagnosis of Peritonitis, which turned out to be a complication of acute appendicitis (appendectomy). After that he was sent to the clinic in Freiburg, Germany, where he went a long course of treatment, moving through more than 30 operations. A year later he returned to Krasnodar and continued to work in the administration of Krasnodar Krai.

The evening of December 7, 2010 he died of a heart attack.

Murat Akhedzhak was married, he had two children.

== Commemoration ==
On 27 June 2012, in the city of Kropotkin, Krasnodar Krai, Sergei Yesenin Street was renamed Murat Akhedzhak Street. On 13 July, in Novorossiysk, Krasnodar Krai, one of the newly built streets was also named after Murat Akhedzhak.

== Family ==
Murat Akhedzhak was married and had two children.

His father, Kazbek Ismailovich Akhedzhak, as of 2011, was a co-founder of several companies and the owner of 75 apartments in the “Chistye Prudy” residential complex, with a total area of 5,199 square meters and a market value of 230 million rubles.

== Awards and titles ==
- Order of Friendship (14 June 2009) — for labor achievements, many years of dedicated service.
- Commendation of the President of the Russian Federation (4 October 2008) — for active work in organizing the reception of refugees from South Ossetia and providing humanitarian aid to those affected.
