= Panakhes =

Panakhes Панахес Пэнэхэс
- Aul
- Location within Republic of Adygea Location within Russia
- Coordinates: 44°59′N 38°42′E
- Country: Russia
- Region: Adygea
- District: Takhtamukaysky District
- Time zone: UTC+3:00

Panakhes (Russian: Панахес; Adyghe: Пэнэхэс) is a rural locality (an aul) in Afipsipskoye Rural Settlement of Takhtamukaysky District, the Republic of Adygea, Russia. The population was 1,594 as of 2018. There are 35 streets.

== Geography ==
Panakhes is located 40 km northwest of Takhtamukay (the district's administrative centre) by road. Porono-Pokrovsky is the nearest rural locality.

== Ethnicity ==
The aul is inhabited by Circassians.
