= Krasnoarmeysk =

Krasnoarmeysk may refer to:

- Krasnoarmeysk, Moscow Oblast, a town in Russia, and its surrounding municipal division (urban okrug)
- Krasnoarmeysk, Saratov Oblast, a town in Russia, and its surrounding municipal division (urban okrug)
- Pokrovsk, Ukraine, formerly Krasnoarmiisk (Krasnoarmeysk), a town in Ukraine
- Taiynsha, Kazakhstan, formerly Krasnoarmeysk

== See also ==
- Krasnoarmeysky (disambiguation)
