= Fyodor Chubukov =

- Фёдор Михайлович Чубуков
- Born: 21 June 1920; Budyonny, Voronezh Governorate, RSFSR
- Died: 1 June 1988 (aged 67); Riga, USSR
- Military career
- Allegiance: Soviet Union
- Branch: Soviet Air Force
- Service years: 1939–1962
- Rank: Colonel
- Conflicts: World War II
- Awards: Hero of the Soviet Union

Fyodor Mikhailovich Chubukov (Russian: Фёдор Михайлович Чубуков; 21 June 1920 – 1 June 1988) was a Soviet fighter pilot during World War II. Awarded the title Hero of the Soviet Union on 19 August 1944 for his initial victories, by the end of the war his tally reached 30 solo and five shared shootdowns.
