= Krasnoarmeysky, Nemetsky natsionalny District, Altai Krai =

Krasnoarmeysky Красноармейский
- Selo
- Location within Altai Krai Location within Russia
- Coordinates: 53°14′N 79°13′E
- Country: Russia
- Region: Altai Krai
- District: Nemetsky National District
- Time zone: UTC+7:00

Krasnoarmeysky (Russian: Красноармейский) is a rural locality (a selo) in Nemetsky National District, Altai Krai, Russia. The population was 224 as of 2013. There are 2 streets.

== Geography ==
Krasnoarmeysky is located 22 km east of Galbshtadt (the district's administrative centre) by road. Alexandrovka is the nearest rural locality.
