= Krasnoarmeyskaya =

Krasnoarmeyskaya Красноармейская
- Village
- Location within Bashkortostan Location within Russia
- Coordinates: 53°54′N 55°22′E
- Country: Russia
- Region: Bashkortostan
- District: Sterlitamaksky District
- Time zone: UTC+5:00

Krasnoarmeyskaya (Russian: Красноармейская) is a rural locality (a village) in Pervomaysky Selsoviet, Sterlitamaksky District, Bashkortostan, Russia. The population was 241 as of 2010. There are 2 streets.

== Geography ==
Krasnoarmeyskaya is located 57 km northwest of Sterlitamak (the district's administrative centre) by road. Abdrakhmanovo is the nearest rural locality.
