= Kalininsky District, Saratov Oblast =

Kalininsky District Калининский район (Russian)
- District
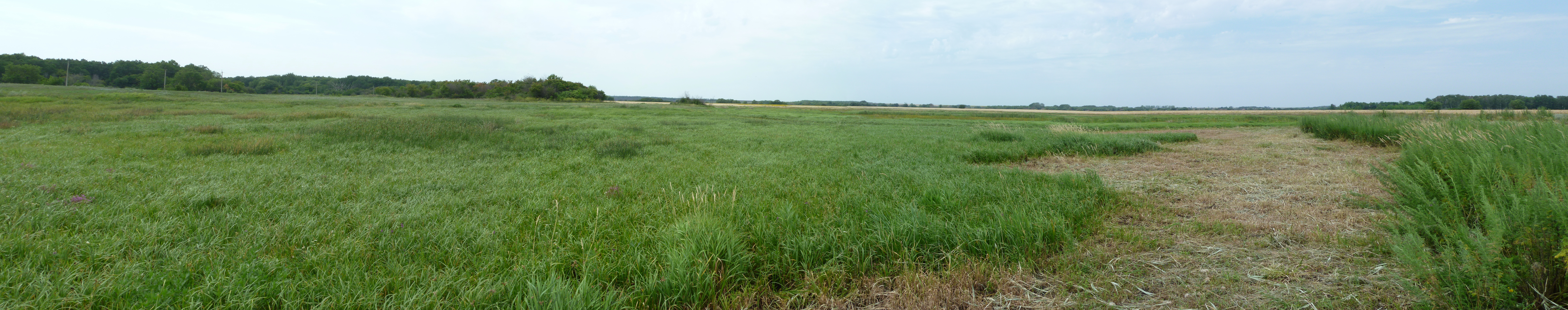
- Landscape in Kalininsky District

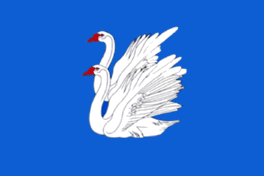
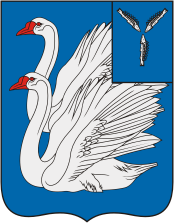
- Flag Coat of arms
- Location of Kalininsky District in Saratov Oblast
- Coordinates: 51°30′N 44°27′E
- Country: Russia
- Federal subject: Saratov Oblast
- Established: 23 July 1928
- Administrative center: Kalininsk

Area
  - Total: 3,200 km^{2} (1,200 sq mi)

Population (2010 Census)
  - Total: 33,302
  - Density: 10/km^{2} (27/sq mi)
  - Urban: 49.4%
  - Rural: 50.6%

Administrative structure
  - Inhabited localities: 1 cities/towns, 62 rural localities

Municipal structure
  - Municipally incorporated as: Kalininsky Municipal District
  - Municipal divisions: 1 urban settlements, 10 rural settlements
- Time zone: UTC+4 (MSK+1)
- OKTMO ID: 63621000
- Website: http://kalininsk.sarmo.ru/

Kalininsky District (Russian: Кали́нинский райо́н) is an administrative and municipal district (raion), one of the thirty-eight in Saratov Oblast, Russia. It is located in the west of the oblast. The area of the district is 2,000 square kilometers (770 sq mi). Its administrative center is the town of Kalininsk. Population: 33,302 (2010 Census); 39,732 (2002 census); 39,739 (1989 Soviet census). The population of Kalininsk accounts for 49.4% of the district's total population.
