= Balanda Atis =

American cosmetic chemist

- Born: 1972 or 1973 (age 53–54)
- Occupation: Cosmetic chemist
- Employer: L'Oréal USA

Balanda Atis (born 1972 or 1973) is an American cosmetic chemist. An employee of L'Oréal since 1999, her work expanding the company's range of cosmetics marketed to women of color has been covered by fashion publications such as Harper's Bazaar and Elle.

== Early life and education ==
A first-generation Haitian American, Atis grew up in East Orange, New Jersey. She earned a bachelor's degree in biology from Rutgers University and a master of science from Fairleigh Dickinson University's cosmetic science program.

== Career ==
As a chemist at the company Playtex Products, Atis worked on various brands of personal care products including Banana Boat, Jhirmack, Ogilvie, and Tan Express. When she joined L'Oréal USA in 1999, she first worked on mascara formulations. Not satisfied with existing makeup for dark-skinned women, in 2007, she started a side project at her job with the permission of the head of the company's makeup division. Atis and two other L'Oréal scientists went to shows hosted by the company across the United States and collected skin color measurements from women of color. Through her research at the company, she discovered that ultramarine could be utilized in foundations to create rich and deeper shades while avoiding the muddy finish common in existing products for dark skin tones.

Atis was made manager of a laboratory opened by the company in 2014 dedicated to developing cosmetics for a range of skin tones. She also developed the foundation that actress Lupita Nyong'o wore in ads for L'Oréal's Lancôme promotional campaign starting that year. In October 2020, Elle magazine named Atis one of "10 Black women making history" and identified her as the "driving force" behind the expanding range of makeup shades—to accommodate all Black skin colors—in brands like Armani, Lancôme, Maybelline, and Urban Decay.
