= Krasnoarmeyskoye, Samara Oblast =

Rural locality in Samara Oblast, Russia

Coordinates: 52°43′22″N 50°2′8″E

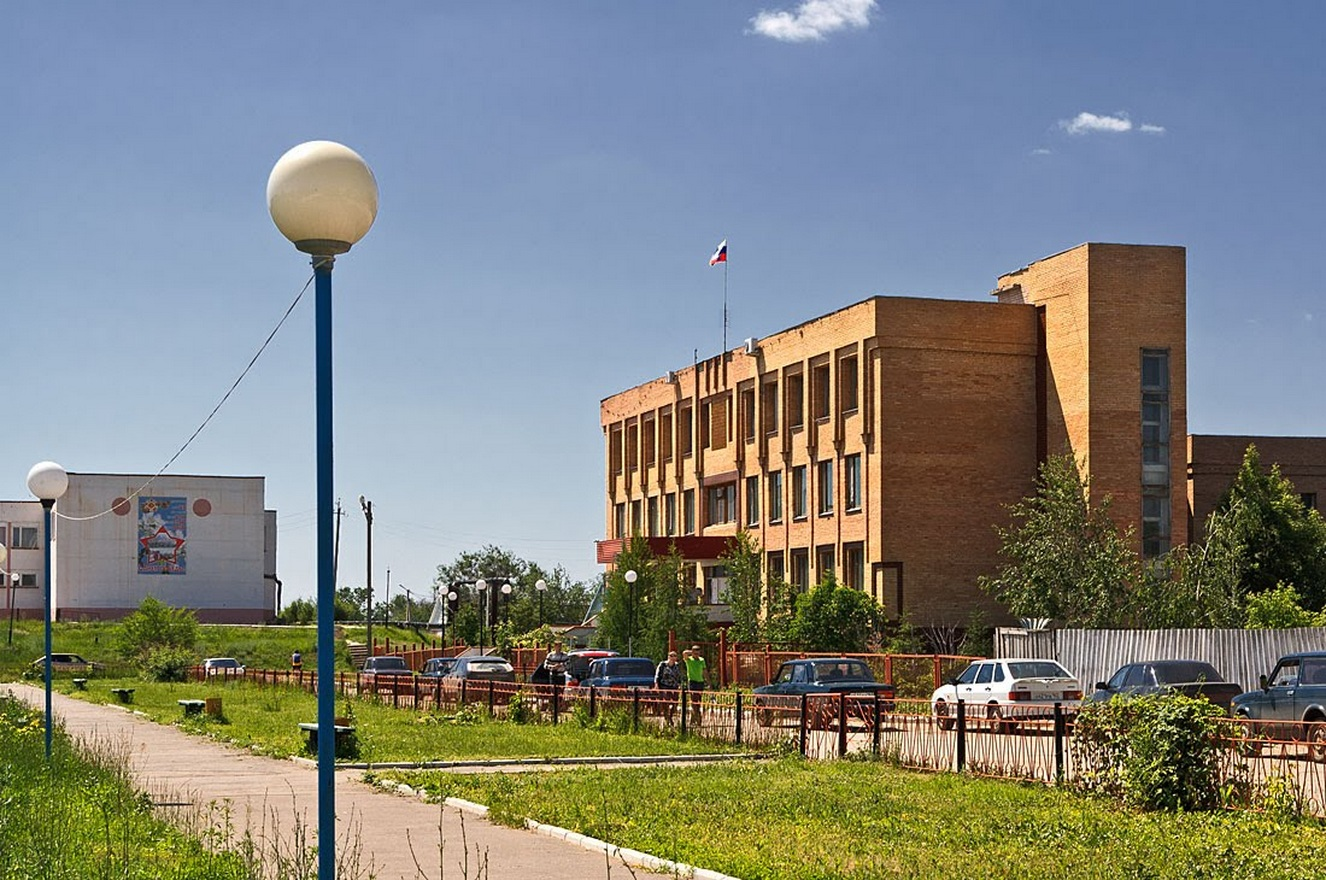

Krasnoarmeyskoye (Russian: Красноармейское) is a rural locality (a selo) in the Krasnoarmeysky District in Samara Oblast, Russia. Population: 5,344 (2010 census); 5,445 (2002 census);
