= Balanda (river) =

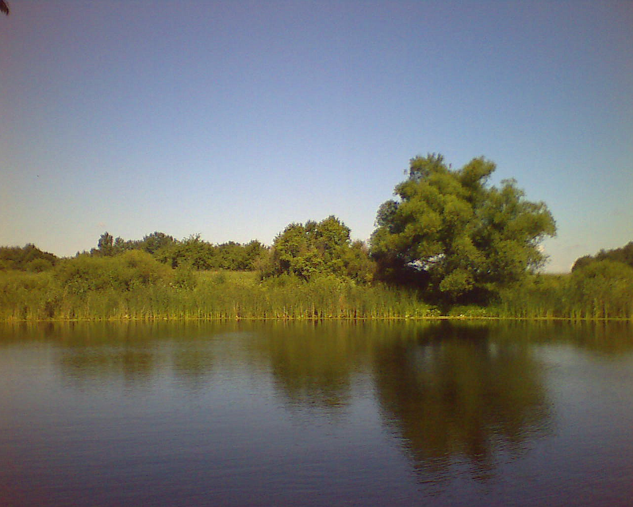
- Native name: Баланда (Russian)

Location
- Country: Russia

Physical characteristics
- Mouth: Medveditsa
  - coordinates: 51.3415°N 44.7891°E
- Length: 164 km (102 mi)
- Basin size: 1,900 km^{2} (730 sq mi)

Basin features
- Progression: Medveditsa→ Don→ Sea of Azov

Balanda (Russian: Баланда) is a river in Volgograd and Saratov Oblasts in Russia, a right tributary of the Medveditsa (a tributary of the Don. It is 164 kilometres (102 mi) long, with a drainage basin of 1,900 square kilometres (730 mi^{2}).

The river has its sources on the Volga Uplands in Saratov oblast, and flows in a southwesterly direction to its confluence with the Medveditsa in Volgograd Oblast. Most of the Balandas waters is from snow melting on the Volga Uplands.

The town of Kalininsk is situated by the Balanda.
