= Krasnoarmeysky, Kumylzhensky District, Volgograd Oblast =

Krasnoarmeysky Красноармейский
- Khutor
- Location within Volgograd Oblast Location within Russia
- Coordinates: 49°58′N 42°26′E
- Country: Russia
- Region: Volgograd Oblast
- District: Kumylzhensky District
- Time zone: UTC+4:00

Krasnoarmeysky (Russian: Красноармейский) is a rural locality (a khutor) in Kumylzhenskoye Rural Settlement, Kumylzhensky District, Volgograd Oblast, Russia. The population was 291 as of 2010. There are 8 streets.

== Geography ==
Krasnoarmeysky is located in forest steppe, on Khopyorsko-Buzulukskaya Plain, on the bank of the Stary Khopyor River, 24 km northwest of Kumylzhenskaya (the district's administrative centre) by road. Kuchurovsky is the nearest rural locality.
