= Archeda =

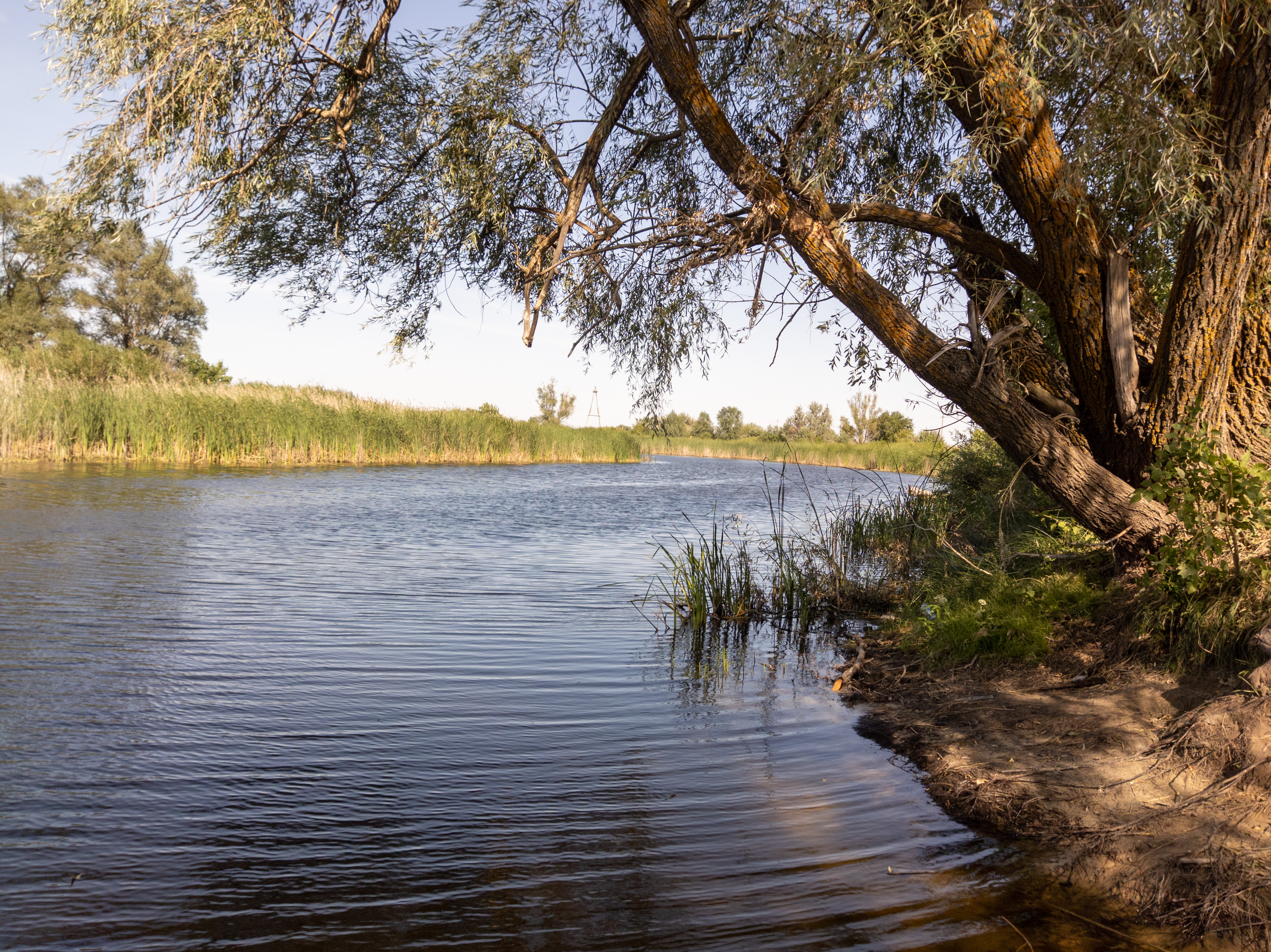

- Location of mouth in Russia
- Native name: Арчеда (Russian)

Location
- Country: Russia

Physical characteristics
- Mouth: Medveditsa
  - coordinates: 49.8775°N 43.1586°E
- Length: 162 km (101 mi)
- Basin size: 2,050 km^{2} (790 sq mi)

Basin features
- Progression: Medveditsa→ Don→ Sea of Azov

The Archeda (Russian: Арчеда) is a river in Volgograd Oblast, Russia. It is a left tributary of the Medveditsa, and is 162 kilometres (101 mi) long, with a drainage basin of 2,050 square kilometres (790 mi^{2}). The Archeda begins in the southwestern part of the Volga Uplands. Most of its water comes from melting snow, and during periods of low water the river dries up entirely in its upper and middle flow. The town of Frolovo lies along the Archeda.
