= Krasnoarmeyskoye, Ivanovo Oblast =

Krasnoarmeyskoye Красноармейское
- Village
- Location within Ivanovo Oblast Location within Russia
- Coordinates: 56°45′N 41°26′E
- Country: Russia
- Region: Ivanovo Oblast
- District: Shuysky District
- Time zone: UTC+3:00

Krasnoarmeyskoye (Russian: Красноармейское) is a rural locality (a selo) in Shuysky District, Ivanovo Oblast, Russia. Population: 41 (2010 census);

== Geography ==
This rural locality is located 12 kilometres (7.5 mi) from Shuya (the district's administrative centre), 39 kilometres (24 mi) from Ivanovo (capital of Ivanovo Oblast) and 258 kilometres (160 mi) from Moscow. Polki is the nearest rural locality.
