= Krasnoarmeysky, Novonikolayevsky District, Volgograd Oblast =

Krasnoarmeysky Красноармейский
- Khutor
- Location within Volgograd Oblast Location within Russia
- Coordinates: 51°02′N 42°54′E
- Country: Russia
- Region: Volgograd Oblast
- District: Novonikolayevsky District
- Time zone: UTC+4:00

Krasnoarmeysky (Russian: Красноармейский) is a rural locality (a khutor) and the administrative center of Krasnoarmeyskoye Rural Settlement, Novonikolayevsky District, Volgograd Oblast, Russia. The population was 958 as of 2010. There are 21 streets.

== Geography ==
Krasnoarmeysky is located in steppe, on the Khopyorsko-Buzulukskaya Plain, 51 km northeast of Novonikolayevsky (the district's administrative centre) by road. Novoberezovsky is the nearest rural locality.
