= Krasnoarmeysky District, Samara Oblast =

Krasnoarmeysky District Красноармейский район (Russian)
- District
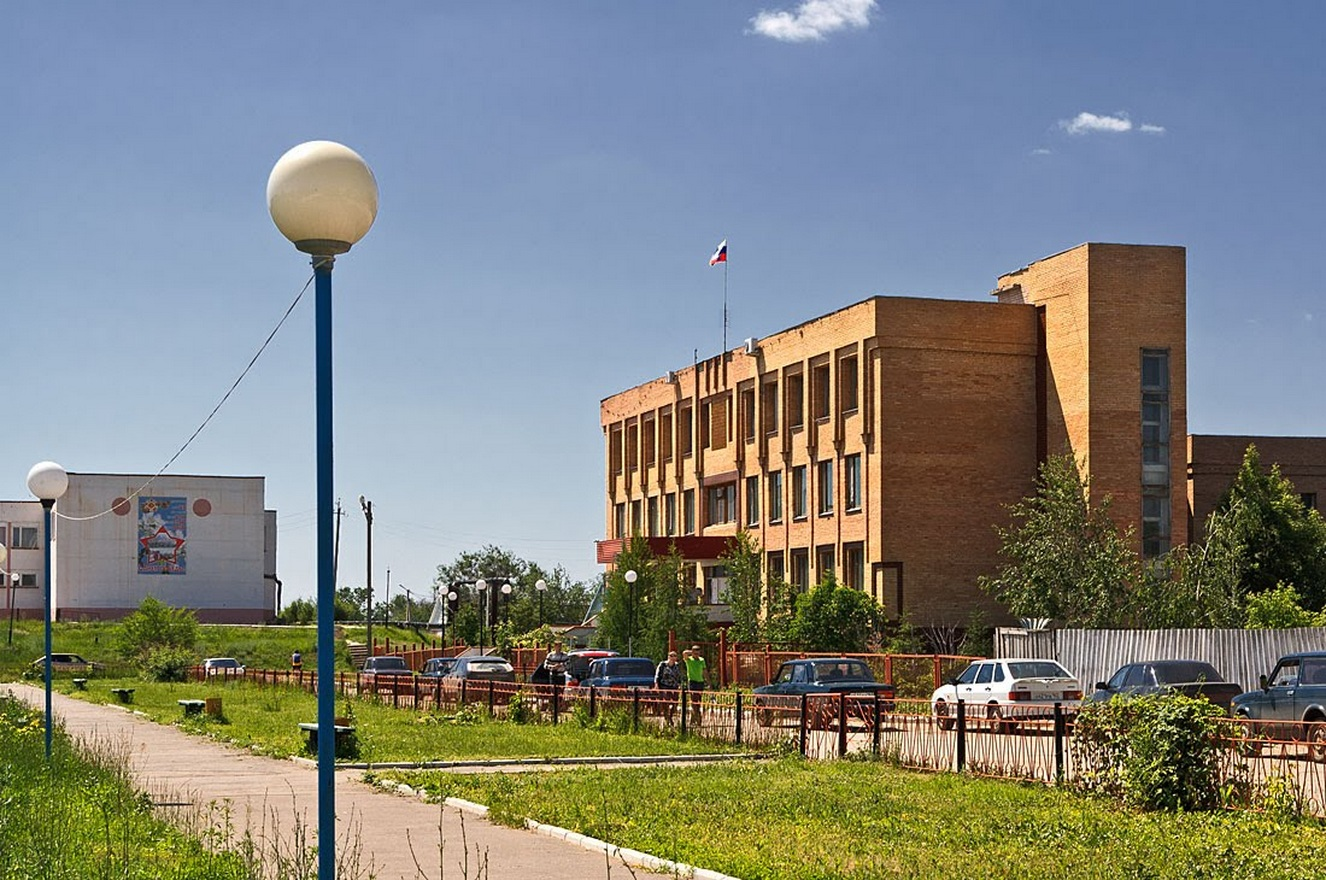
- District administration building in Krasnoarmeyskoye, Krasnoarmeysky District

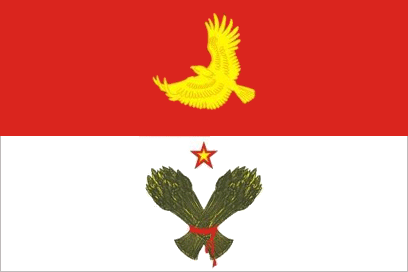
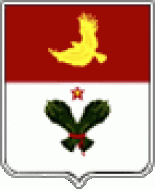
- Flag Coat of arms
- Location of Krasnoarmeysky District in Samara Oblast
- Coordinates: 52°43′59″N 49°55′15″E
- Country: Russia
- Federal subject: Samara Oblast
- Established: 25 February 1935
- Administrative center: Krasnoarmeyskoye

Area
  - Total: 2,190 km^{2} (850 sq mi)

Population (2010 Census)
  - Total: 18,050
  - Density: 8.24/km^{2} (21.3/sq mi)
  - Urban: 0%
  - Rural: 100%

Administrative structure
  - Inhabited localities: 42 rural localities

Municipal structure
  - Municipally incorporated as: Krasnoarmeysky Municipal District
  - Municipal divisions: 0 urban settlements, 12 rural settlements
- Time zone: UTC+4 (MSK+1)
- OKTMO ID: 36626000
- Website: http://krasnoarmeysky.ru/

Krasnoarmeysky District (Russian: Красноарме́йский райо́н) is an administrative and municipal district (raion), one of the twenty-seven in Samara Oblast, Russia. It is located in the southwest of the oblast. The area of the district is 2,190 square kilometers (850 sq mi). Its administrative center is the rural locality (a selo) of Krasnoarmeyskoye. Population: 18,050 (2010 Census); 19,211 (2002 census); 17,516 (1989 Soviet census). The population of Krasnoarmeyskoye accounts for 29.6% of the district's total population.
