= Yablonovsky, Republic of Adygea =

Yablonovsky Яблоновский
- Urban-type settlement

Other transcription(s)
  - Adyghe: Яблоновскэ or Кощхьабл
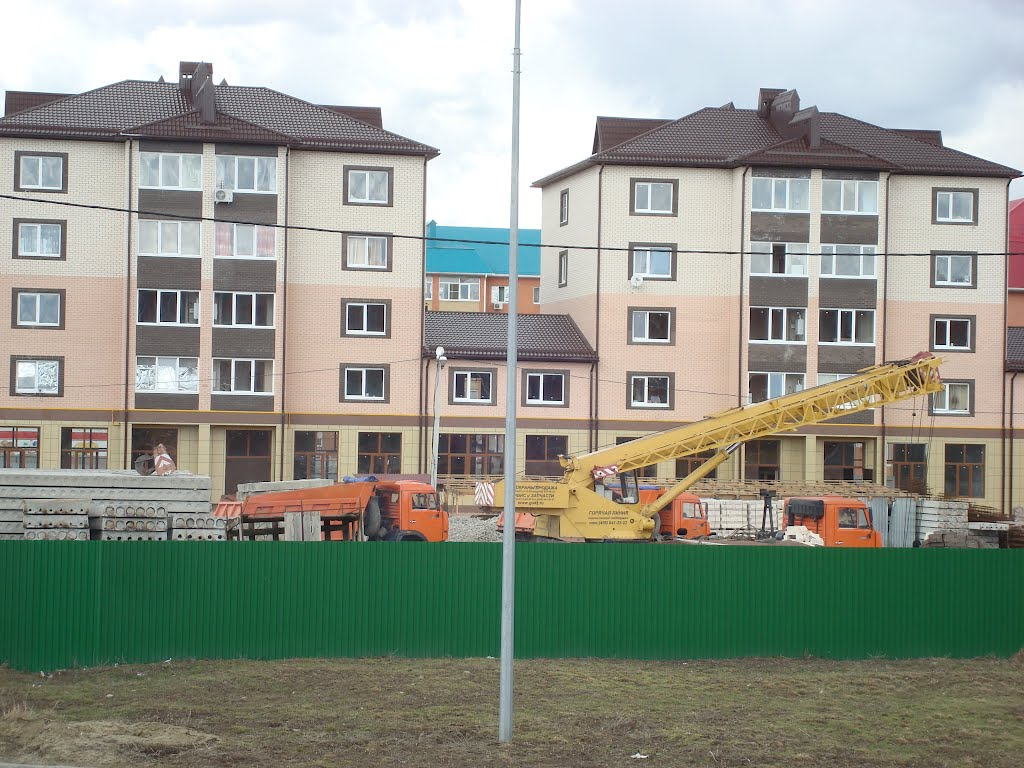
- In Yablonovsky
- Interactive map of Yablonovsky
- Location of Yablonovsky Yablonovsky (Republic of Adygea)
- Coordinates: 44°59′10″N 38°56′20″E
- Country: Russia
- Federal subject: Adygea
- Administrative district: Takhtamukaysky District
- Founded: 1888
- Elevation: 18 m (59 ft)

Population (2010 Census)
  - Total: 26,171
  - Estimate (2024): 56,972 (+117.7%)

Municipal status
  - Municipal district: Takhtamukaysky Municipal District
  - Urban settlement: Yablonovskoye Urban Settlement
  - Capital of: Yablonovskoye Urban Settlement
- Time zone: UTC+3 (MSK)
- Postal codes: 385140, 385141
- OKTMO ID: 79630159051
- Website: adm-yabl.ru

Yablonovsky (Russian: Яблоно́вский; Adyghe: Яблоновскэ or Кощхьабл), informally called Yablonovka (Яблоно́вка), is an urban locality (an urban-type settlement) in Takhtamukaysky District of the Republic of Adygea, Russia, located on the left bank of the Kuban River across Krasnodar in Krasnodar Krai, 252 kilometers (157 mi) northwest of Maykop, the capital of the republic. As of the 2010 Census, its population was 26,171.

Historical population
Year	Pop.	±%
1959	13,327	—
1970	19,518	+46.5%
1979	23,709	+21.5%
1989	24,939	+5.2%
2002	25,063	+0.5%
2010	26,171	+4.4%
2021	54,291	+107.4%
Source: Census data

An urban locality since 1958.

== Geography ==
Yablonovsky is connected with Krasnodar in Krasnodar Krai by means of bridges across the Kuban River.

== Climate ==
Climate data for Yablonovsky
Month	Jan	Feb	Mar	Apr	May	Jun	Jul	Aug	Sep	Oct	Nov	Dec	Year
Humidex	0.8	1.9	6.5	11.9	17.9	22.2	25.0	24.7	19.2	12.9	6.3	2.4	11.9

== History ==
In October 2009, Former President of Adygea Aslan Tkhakushinov named Yablonovsky the prime candidate for being granted town status due to its being the largest urban locality in Adygea after Maykop and its being larger than Adygeysk, as well as due to its proximity to Krasnodar.

== Administrative and municipal status ==
Within the framework of administrative divisions, the urban-type settlement of Yablonovsky is subordinated to Takhtamukaysky District. As a municipal division, Yablonovsky, together with two rural localities, is incorporated within Takhtamukaysky Municipal District as Yablonovskoye Urban Settlement.
