= Medveditsa (Don) =

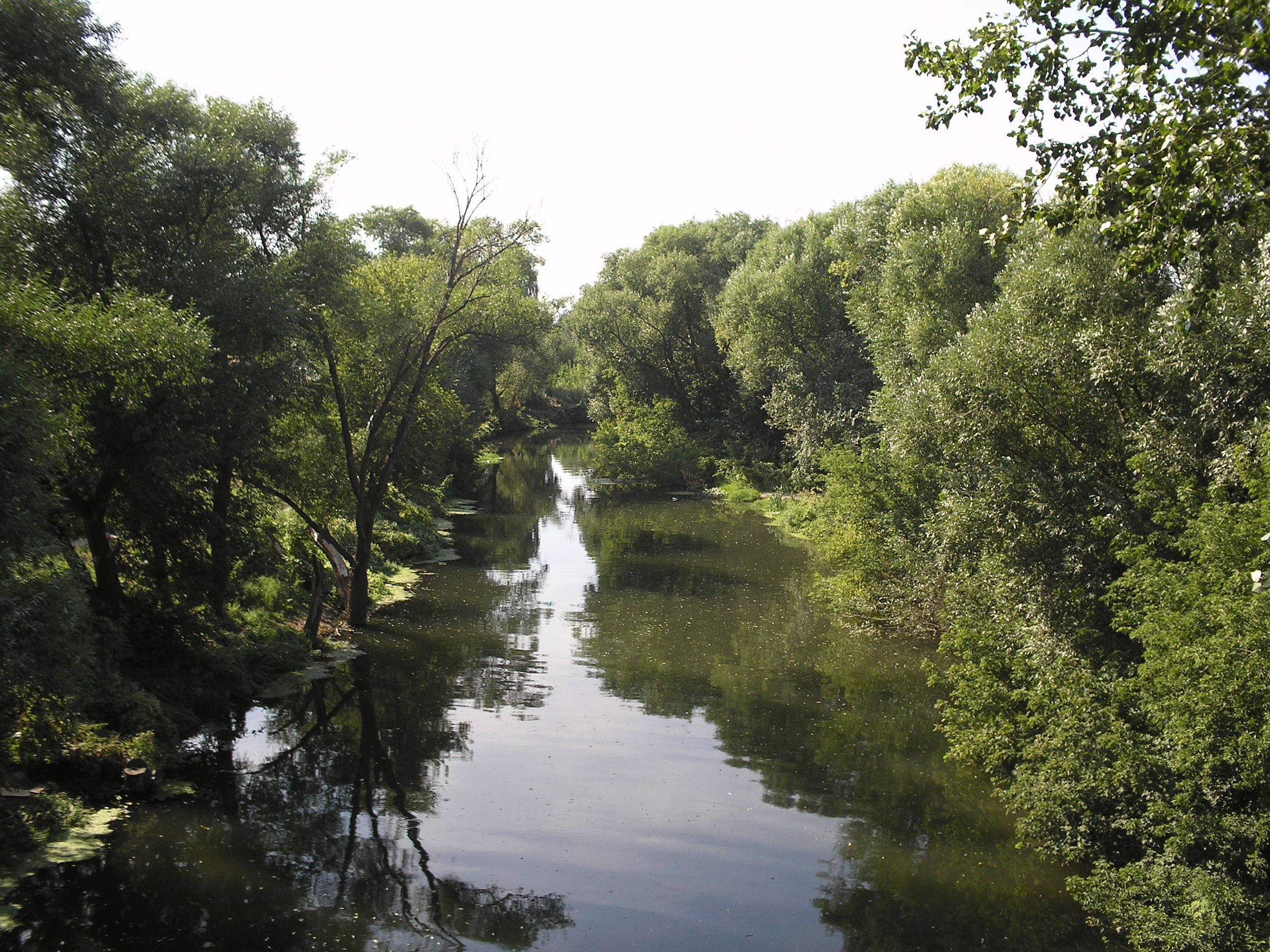
- The Medveditsa near Atkarsk

Location
- Country: Volgograd and Saratov Oblast, Russia

Physical characteristics
- Source
  - location: Volga Uplands
- Mouth: Don
  - coordinates: 49.5763°N 42.6385°E
- Length: 745 km (463 mi)
- Basin size: 34,700 km^{2} (13,400 sq mi)
- Discharge
  - average: 69 cubic metres per second (2,400 cu ft/s)

Basin features
- Progression: Don→ Sea of Azov
- Tributaries
  - left: Idolga, Karamysh, Archeda
  - right: Balanda, Tersa

The Medveditsa or Medveditza (/mɛdˈvɛdɪtsə/; Russian: Медведица, romanized: Medvedica, IPA: [mʲɪdˈvʲedʲɪtsə]) is a river in Volgograd and Saratov Oblasts in Russia, a left tributary of the Don. The name means she-bear, and according to legend, it alludes to the large population of bears in the area in earlier times. It is 745 kilometres (463 mi) long, with a drainage basin of 34,700 square kilometres (13,400 mi^{2}).

The river has its sources on the Volga Uplands, in the northeastern parts of Saratov Oblast, and flows mainly in a southwestern direction. It joins the Reka Don in Volgograd Oblast near Zatonski. Its largest tributaries are, from the right: Balanda and Tersa, and from the left: Idolga, Karamysh and Archeda.

The towns of Petrovsk, Atkarsk, Medveditsa, Zhirnovsk, and Mikhaylovka are situated on the Medveditsa. The river is navigable to Atkarsk.

A variety of fish is found in the Medveditsa River: catfish, pike, bream, asp, perch, chub, perch, tench, roach, gudgeon and others. In the late 80s there were a lot of sterlet.

Forests along both banks of the river have a wide variety of birds, medicinal herbs, wild berries, fruits and flowers.
