= Takhtamukaysky District =

Takhtamukaysky District Тахтамукайский район (Russian)
- District

Other transcription(s)
  - Adyghe: Тэхъутэмыкъуае къедзыгъо
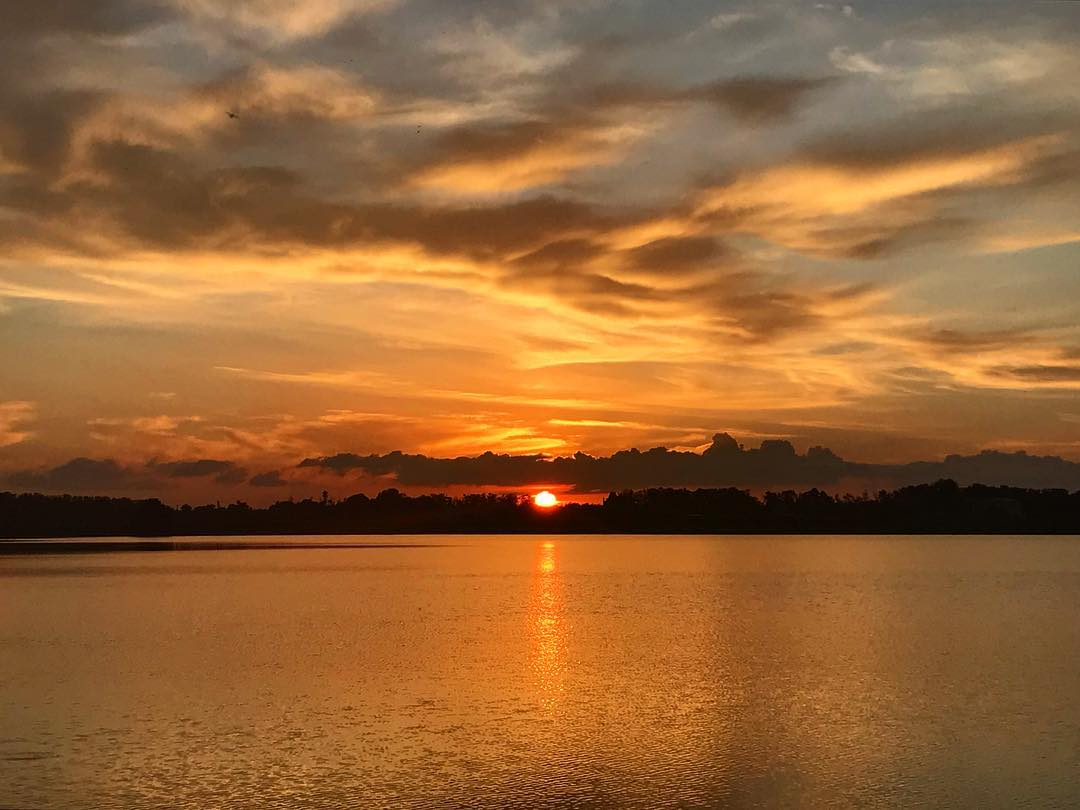
- Sunset in lake Starobzhegokaya, Takhtamukaysky District

- Coat of arms
- Location of Takhtamukaysky District in the Republic of Adygea
- Coordinates: 44°55′N 39°00′E
- Country: Russia
- Federal subject: Republic of Adygea
- Established: September 2, 1924 (first), December 31, 1934 (second), April 25, 1983 (third)
- Administrative center: Takhtamukay

Government
  - Type: Local government
  - Head: Azmet Skhalyakho

Area
  - Total: 463.6 km^{2} (179.0 sq mi)

Population (2010 Census)
  - Total: 69,662
  - Density: 150.3/km^{2} (389.2/sq mi)
  - Urban: 63.2%
  - Rural: 36.8%

Administrative structure
  - Inhabited localities: 2 urban-type settlements, 25 rural localities

Municipal structure
  - Municipally incorporated as: Takhtamukaysky Municipal District
  - Municipal divisions: 2 urban settlements, 5 rural settlements
- Time zone: UTC+3 (MSK)
- OKTMO ID: 79630000
- Website: http://ta01.ru

Takhtamukaysky District (Russian: Тахтамука́йский райо́н; Adyghe: Тэхъутэмыкъуае къедзыгъо) is an administrative and a municipal district (raion), one of the seven in the Republic of Adygea, Russia. It is located in the west of the republic and borders with Krasnoarmeysky District of Krasnodar Krai and with the territory of the City of Krasnodar in the north, Teuchezhsky District in the east, the territory of the Town of Goryachy Klyuch of Krasnodar Krai in the south, and with Seversky District of Krasnodar Krai in the south and west. The area of the district is 463.6 square kilometers (179.0 sq mi). Its administrative center is the rural locality (an aul) of Takhtamukay. At the 2010 Census, the total population of the district was 69,662, with the population of Takhtamukay accounting for 7.5% of that number.

Historical population
Year	Pop.	±%
1959	34,322	—
1989	64,650	+88.4%
2002	65,674	+1.6%
2010	69,662	+6.1%
2021	122,759	+76.2%
Source: Census data

== History ==
The district was first established on September 2, 1924, but was abolished a few years later on February 7, 1929. On December 31, 1934, the district was re-established and existed until February 1, 1963, when it was merged into Teuchezhsky Rural District. The district was again re-established, in its modern form, on April 25, 1983, under the name of Oktyabrsky. It was renamed Takhtamukaysky in 1990.

== Administrative and municipal status ==
Within the framework of administrative divisions, Takhtamukaysky District is one of the seven in the Republic of Adygea and has administrative jurisdiction over two urban-type settlements and twenty-five rural localities. As a municipal division, the district is incorporated as Takhtamukaysky Municipal District. The two urban-type settlements and six rural localities are incorporated into two urban settlements, while the remaining nineteen rural localities are incorporated into five rural settlements within the municipal district. The aul of Takhtamukay serves as the administrative center of both the administrative and municipal district.

=== Municipal composition ===
Urban settlements

1. Enemskoye Urban Settlement (Энемское)
  - urban-type settlement of Enem
  rural localities under jurisdiction of the urban-type settlement:
  - settlement of Druzhny
  - aul of Novobzhegokay
  - khutor of Novy Sad
  - khutor of Supovsky
2. Yablonovskoye Urban Settlement (Яблоновское)
  - urban-type settlement of Yablonovsky
  rural localities under jurisdiction of the urban-type settlement:
  - settlement of Novy
  - settlement of Perekatny

Rural settlements

1. Afipsipskoye Rural Settlement (Афипсипское)
  Administrative center: aul of Afipsip
  other localities of the rural settlement:
  - aul of Khashtuk
  - settlement of Kubanstroy
  - aul of Panakhes
  - aul of Pseytuk
2. Kozetskoye Rural Settlement (Козетское)
  Administrative center: aul of Kozet
3. Shendzhiyskoye Rural Settlement (Шенджийское)
  Administrative center: aul of Shendzhy
  other localities of the rural settlement:
  - khutor of Krasnoarmeysky
  - khutor of Novomogilyovsky
  - khutor of Staromogilyovsky
4. Starobzhegokayskoye Rural Settlement (Старобжегокайское)
  Administrative center: aul of Starobzhegokay
  other localities of the rural settlement:
  - khutor of Khomuty
  - settlement of Novaya Adygea
5. Takhtamukayskoye Rural Settlement (Тахтамукайское)
  Administrative center: aul of Takhtamukay
  other localities of the rural settlement:
  - khutor of Apostolidi
  - aul of Natukhay
  - settlement of Otradny
  - settlement of Prikubansky
  - settlement of Sups
