= Prigorodny, Volgograd Oblast =

Rural locality in Volgograd Oblast, Russia

Coordinates: 49.787°N 43.652°E

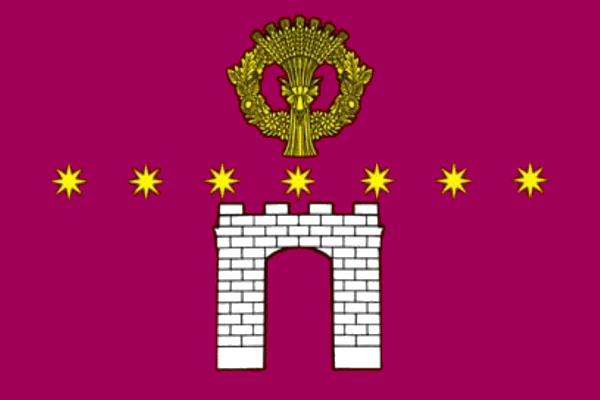
Flag of Prigorodny

Prigorodny (Russian: Пригородный) is a rural locality (a settlement) in Frolovsky District of Volgograd Oblast, Russia. Prigorodny serves as an administrative center of Frolovsky Municipal District. Population: 3,437 (2021 census).
