= Frolovsky District =

Frolovsky District Фроловский район (Russian)
- District
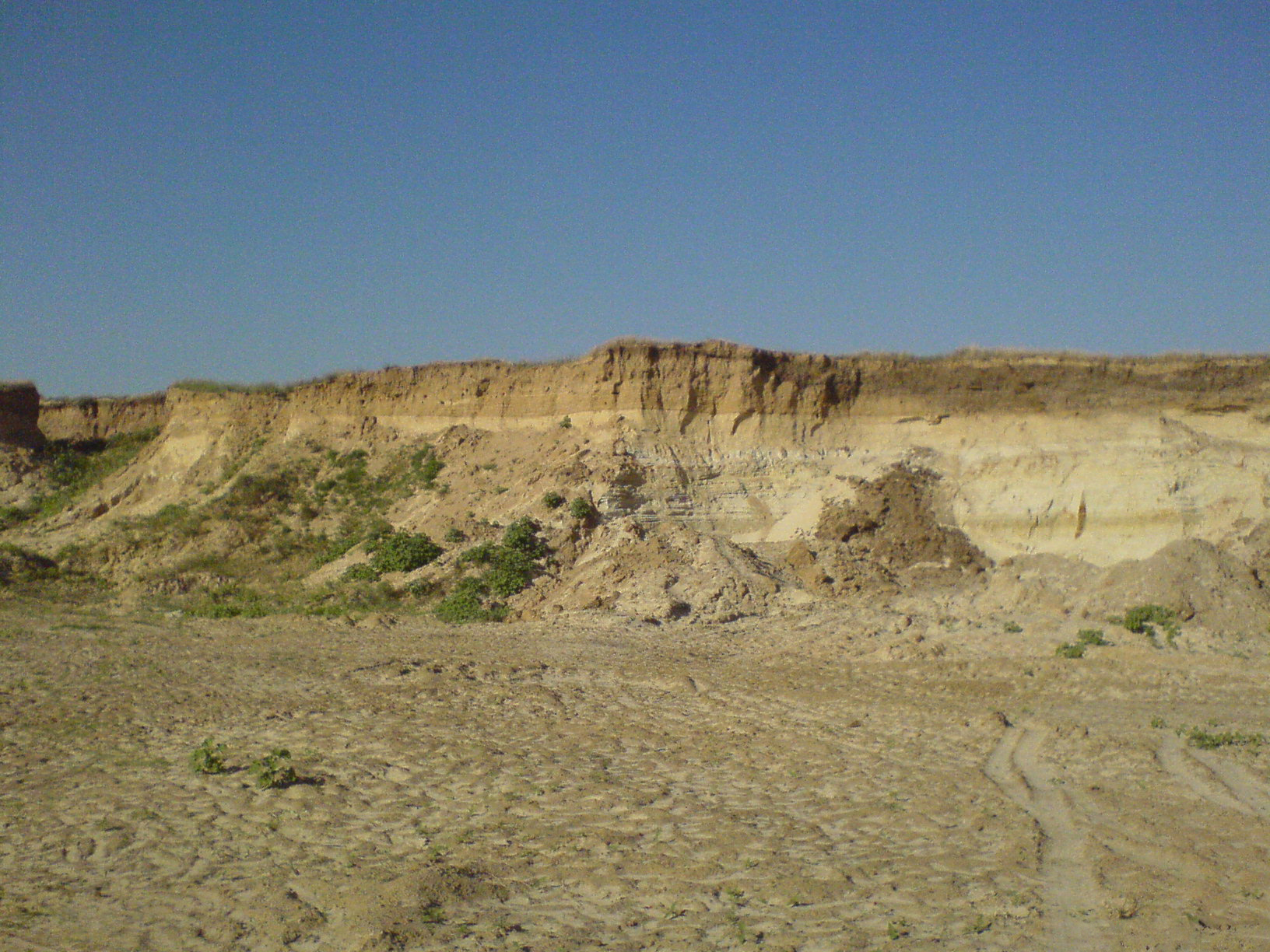
- A sand mine in Frolovsky District

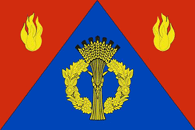
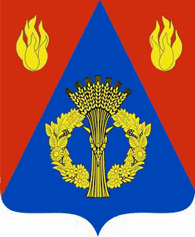
- Flag Coat of arms
- Location of Frolovsky District in Volgograd Oblast
- Coordinates: 49°46′N 43°39′E
- Country: Russia
- Federal subject: Volgograd Oblast
- Established: 12 July 1928
- Administrative center: Prigorodny

Area
  - Total: 3,210 km^{2} (1,240 sq mi)

Population (2010 Census)
  - Total: 14,631
  - Density: 4.56/km^{2} (11.8/sq mi)
  - Urban: 0%
  - Rural: 100%

Administrative structure
  - Administrative divisions: 13 Selsoviets
  - Inhabited localities: 46 rural localities

Municipal structure
  - Municipally incorporated as: Frolovsky Municipal District
  - Municipal divisions: 0 urban settlements, 11 rural settlements
- Time zone: UTC+3 (MSK)
- OKTMO ID: 18656000

Frolovsky District (Russian: Фро́ловский райо́н) is an administrative district (raion), one of the thirty-three in Volgograd Oblast, Russia. As a municipal division, it is incorporated as Frolovsky Municipal District. It is located in the center of the oblast. The area of the district is 3,210 square kilometers (1,240 sq mi). Its administrative center is the town of Frolovo (which is not administratively a part of the district). Population: 14,631 (2010 census); 16,720 (2002 Census); 15,807 (1989 Soviet census).

== Administrative and municipal status ==
Within the framework of administrative divisions, Frolovsky District is one of the thirty-three in the oblast. The town of Frolovo serves as its administrative center, despite being incorporated separately as a town of oblast significance—an administrative unit with the status equal to that of the districts.

As a municipal division, the district is incorporated as Frolovsky Municipal District, with the administrative center in the settlement of Prigorodny. The town of oblast significance of Frolovo is incorporated separately from the district as Frolovo Urban Okrug.
