= Takhtamukay =

Aul in Adygea, Russia

Coordinates: 44°55′16″N 38°59′34″E

Takhtamukay (Russian: Тахтамука́й; Adyghe: Тэхъутэмыкъуай [taχʷtaməqʷaːj], Teh̦utemyqwaj) is a rural locality (an aul) and the administrative center of Takhtamukaysky District of the Republic of Adygea, Russia, located 118 kilometers (73 mi) northwest of Maykop. Population: 5,214 (2010 census); 5,117 (2002 census); 5,212 (1989 Soviet census).

Before 1990, its name was Oktyabrsky (Октя́брьский).

Kurgans dated between the 2nd and 1st millennium BCE are located in the vicinity of the aul.
