= Władysław Leon Sapieha =

Polish prince and magnate

Prince Władysław Leon Sapieha
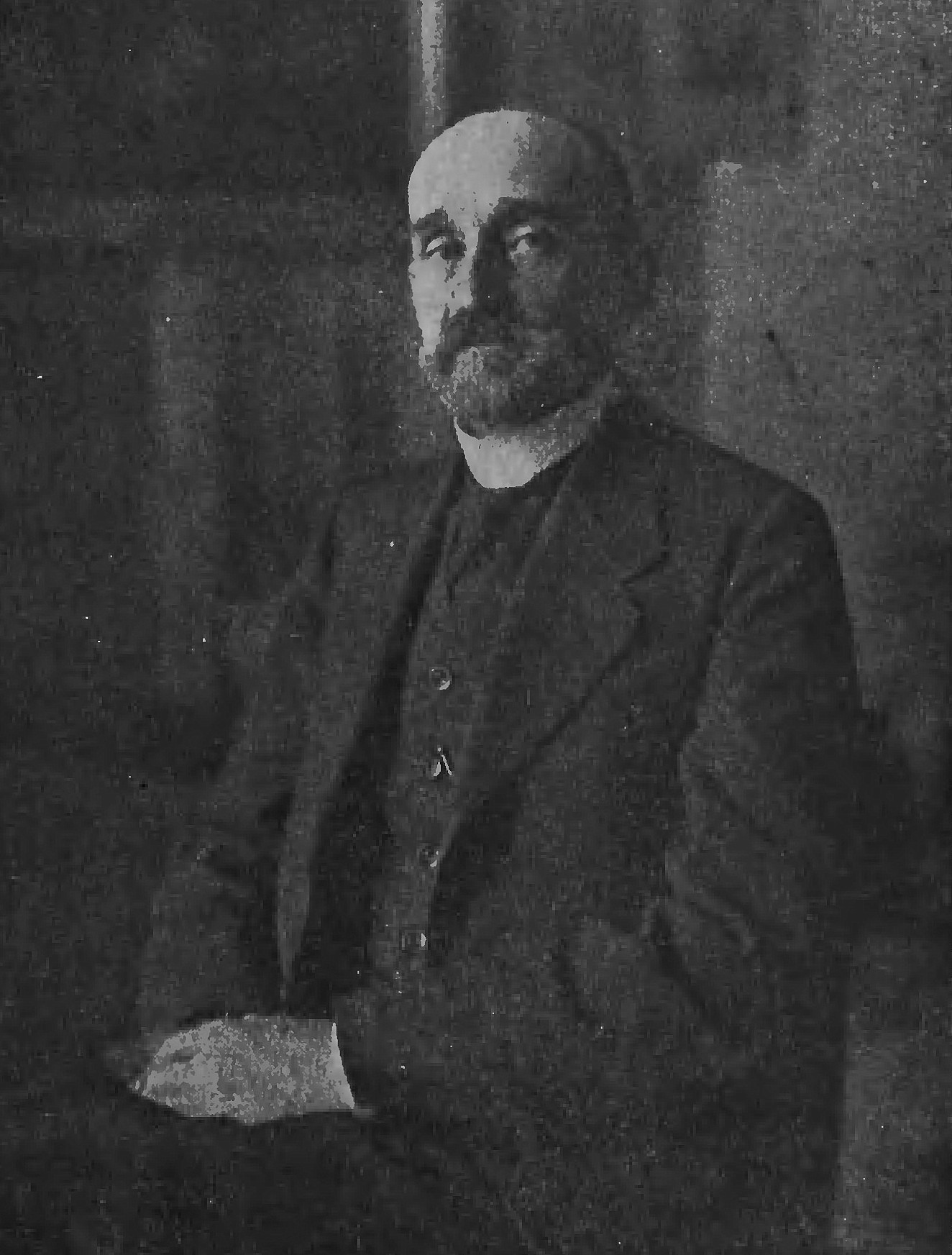
- Born: 30 May 1853; Krasiczyn, Kingdom of Galicia and Lodomeria, Austrian Empire
- Died: 29 April 1920 (aged 66); Lwów, Republic of Poland
- Burial: Krasiczyn
- Spouse: Elżbieta Konstancja Potulicka
- Issue: Kazimierz Leon Sapieha; Leon Aleksander Sapieha; Józef Adam Sapieha; Aleksander Józefat Sapieha; Adam Zygmunt Sapieha; Władysław Sapieha; Andrzej Józef Sapieha; Stanisław Sapieha; Countess Anna Bielski; Princess Teresa Drucki-Lubecki
Names
- Władysław Leon Adam Feliks Sapieha
- Noble family: Sapieha
- Father: Prince Adam Stanisław Sapieha
- Mother: Princess Jadwiga Sanguszko

Prince Władysław Leon Adam Feliks Sapieha (30 May 1853 – 29 April 1920) was a Polish prince (książę) and magnate, member of the Sapieha family (Kodeński line), landowner, social activist, deputy to the Diet of Galicia and Reichsrat.

== Biography ==
Władysław Leon was the oldest son of Prince Adam Stanisław Sapieha and his wife, Princess Jadwiga Klementyna Sanguszko. He had two sisters and four brothers, among them Cardinal Adam Sapeiha.

From 1864 to 1871, Leon attended gymnasium, then studied law in Berlin and later in Heidelberg, and graduated in Lviv in 1876. After graduating, he spent one year serving in army. In 1877, he took a position as a clerk but resigned from the job after his brother Leon Paweł persuaded him to manage the family estate in Krasiczyn. In 1883, he was elected deputy to the Diet of Galicia where he was member of the "Center" Parliamentary group along with Prince Jerzy Konstanty Czartoryski. As a deputy, he was a member of the parliamentary commissions of budget, mining, lustration and taxes. He did not apply for re-election in 1889. In 1883, he became a member of the Economic Society of Galicia. In 1908, he was again elected to the Diet of Galicia. In 1910, he donated archives collected in Krasiczyn to Ossolineum. In 1915, he became a member of the life-saving committee for war-stricken people, established by his brother Prince Adam Stefan Sapieha. He also contributed to running the Agricultural Academy in Dublany. From 1907 he was a member of the House of Lords of Austria-Hungary.

On 30 July 1881, in Cracow, he married Countess Elżbieta Konstancja Potulicka, daughter of Count Kazimierz Wojciech Potulicki and his wife, Countess Maria Zamoyska. Władysław Leon and Elżbieta Konstancja had ten children:

- Kazimierz Leon Sapieha (1882–1906)
- Leon Aleksander Sapieha (1883–1944) - he married Katarzyna Iza Potocka
- Józef Adam Sapieha (1887–1940)
- Aleksander Józefat Sapieha (1888–1980) - he married firstly Elizabeth Hamilton-Paine and secondly Countess Maria Annunciata von Oppersdorff
- Adam Zygmunt Sapieha (1892–1970)
- Władysław Sapieha (1893–1956) - he married Baroness Ilda Bornemisza de Kászon, who was sister-in-law of Heinrich, Baron Thyssen-Bornemisza de Kászon
- Andrzej Józef Sapieha (1894–1944)
- Stanisław Sapieha (1896–1919)
- Anna Sapieha (1901–1965) - she married Count Roman Juliusz Bielski
- Teresa Sapieha (1905–1995) - she married Prince Bogdan Marian Drucki-Lubecki

Władysław Leon died on 29 April 1920 in Lviv and was buried in Krasiczyn. He is the great-great-grandfather of Queen Mathilde of the Belgians.

== Ancestry ==
Ancestors of Władysław Leon Sapieha

16. Prince Józef Sapieha (1737–1792)
8. Prince Aleksander Antoni Sapieha (1773–1812)
17. Princess Teofila Strzeżysława Jabłonowska (1742–1816)
4. Prince Leon Sapieha (1802–1878)
18. Count Andrzej Zamoyski (1716–1792)
9. Countess Anna Jadwiga Zamoyska (1772–1859)
19. Princess Konstancja Czartoryska (1742–1797)
2. Prince Adam Stanisław Sapieha (1828–1903)
20. Count Andrzej Zamoyski (1716–1792)
10. Count Stanisław Kostka Zamoyski (1775–1856)
21. Princess Konstancja Czartoryska (1742–1797)
5. Countess Jadwiga Klementyna Zamoyska (1806–1890)
22. Prince Adam Kazimierz Czartoryski (1734–1823)
11. Princess Zofia Czartoryska (1780–1837)
23. Countess Izabela Fleming (1746–1935)
1. Prince Władysław Leon Sapieha (1853–1920)
24. Prince Hieronim Janusz Sanguszko (1743–1812)
12. Prince Eustachy Erazm Sanguszko (1768–1844)
25. Countess Cecylia Urszula Potocka (1747–1772)
6. Prince Władysław Hieronim Sanguszko (1803–1870)
26. Prince Józef Klemens Czartoryski (1740–1810)
13. Princess Klementyna Czartoryska (1780–1852)
27. Princess Dorota Barbara Jabłonowska (1760–1844)
3. Princess Jadwiga Klementyna Sanguszko (1830–1918)
28. Prince Józef Aleksander Lubomirski (1751–1817)
14. Prince Henryk Ludwik Lubomirski (1777–1850)
29. Ludwika Sosnowska (1751–1836)
7. Princess Izabela Maria Lubomirska (1808–1890)
30. Prince Józef Klemens Czartoryski (1740–1810)
15. Princess Teresa Czartoryska (1785–1868)
31. Princess Dorota Barbara Jabłonowska (1760–1844)

== Sources ==
- Władysław Leon Sapieha at thePeerage.com
- Władysław Leon Sapieha at genealog.home.pl
- Polski słownik biograficzny, Volume 35
- S. Kieniewicz, Adam Sapieha: (1828–1903), Zakład Narodowy im. Ossolińskich, 1939
- K. Krzeczunowicz, Leon Sapieha, 1883-1944, 1967
- E. Sapieha, Dom Sapieżyński, Wydawnictwo Naukowe PWN, 1995
- T. Zielińska, Poczet polskich rodów arystokratycznych, Volume 1, Wydawnictwo Szkolne i Pedagogiczne, 1997
