= Jabłonowski =

Jabłonowski (feminine: Jabłonowska, plural: Jabłonowscy) is a Polish surname. Many, but not all people named Jabłonowski belong to the noble Jabłonowski family.

Notable people with the name include:

- Stanisław Jan Jabłonowski (1634–1702), Field and Great Hetman of the Crown
- Anna Jabłonowska (1660–1727), mother of King Stanisław I Leszczyński
- Jan Stanisław Jabłonowski (1669–1731), political writer, uncle of Stanisław I Leszczyński
- Marianna Jabłonowska (1708–1765), married to Jan Wielopolski
- Aleksander Jan Jabłonowski (died 1723), Great Chorąży
- Józef Aleksander Jabłonowski (1711–1777), Stolnik, voivode
- Antoni Barnaba Jabłonowski (1732–1799), voiode, castellan
- Dorota Barbara Jabłonowska (1760–1844), married to Józef Klemens Czartoryski
- Władysław Franciszek Jabłonowski (1769–1802), Polish and French general
- Leszek Jabłonowski (born 1954), Polish fencer
- Jonathan "EliGE" Jablonowski (born 1997), Professional Counter-Strike 2 player

== See also ==
- Jabłonowski Palace, historic palace in Warsaw
- Yablonovsky (disambiguation), Russian spelling of the surname and toponym
