= Izabela Maria Lubomirska =

Polish noblewoman (1808–1890)

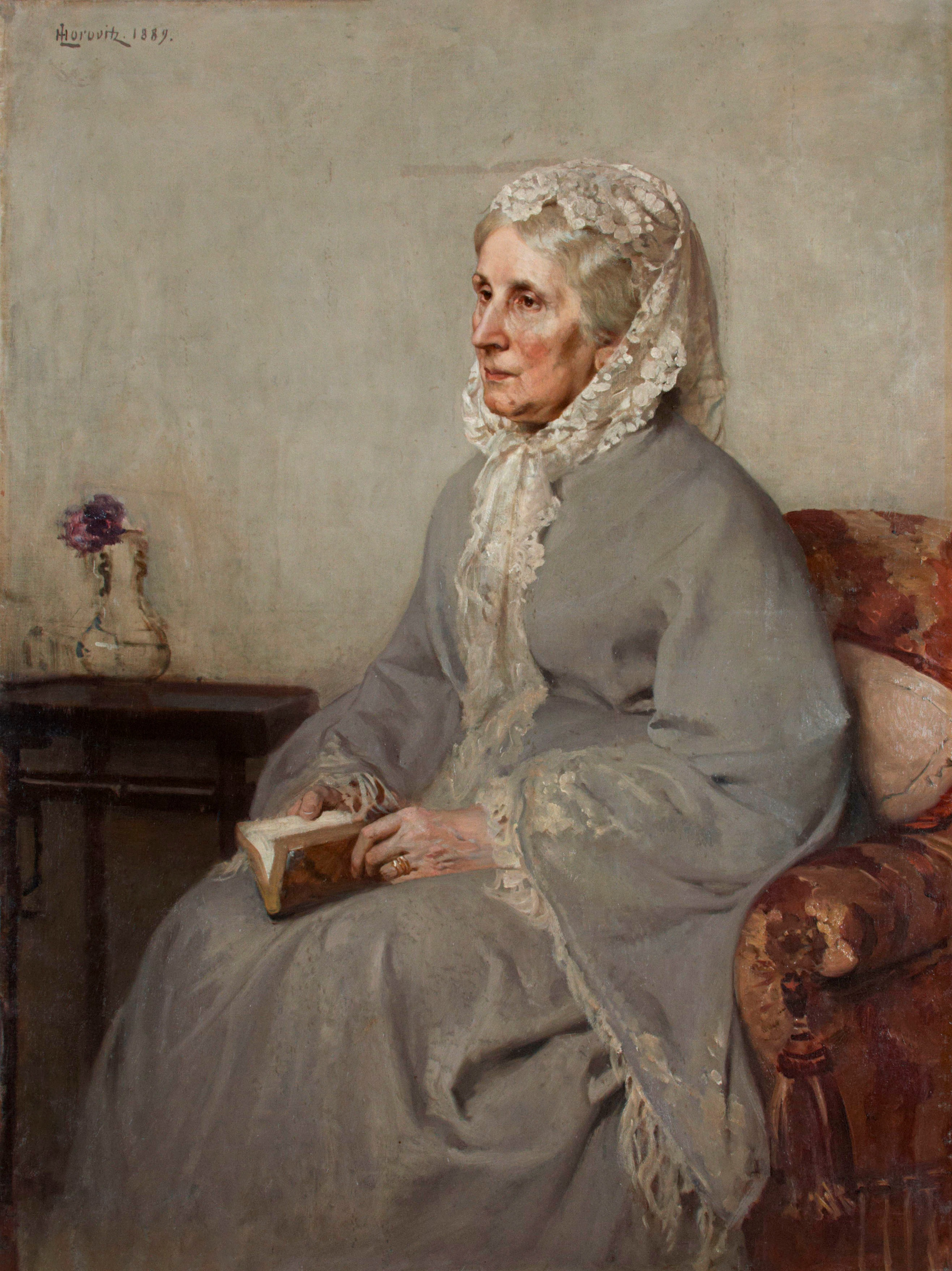
- Princess Izabela Maria Lubomirska
- Born: 1 March 1808; Przeworsk
- Died: 18 March 1890 (aged 82)
- Spouse: Władysław Hieronim Sanguszko
- Issue: Jadwiga Klementyna Sanguszko; Roman Damian Sanguszko; Pawel Roman Sanguszko; Helena Sanguszko; Eustachy Stanisław Sanguszko
Names
- Izabela Maria Lubomirska
- Noble family: Lubomirski (Drużyna coat of arms
- Father: Prince Henryk Ludwik Lubomirski
- Mother: Princess Teresa Czartoryska

Princess Izabela Maria Sanguszko (née Princess Izabela Maria Lubomirska), in Polish Izabela Maria z książąt Lubomirskich księżna Sanguszkowa (1 March 1808 – 18 March 1890) was a Polish noblewoman.

Princess Izabela Maria was born to Prince Henryk Ludwik Lubomirski (15 September 1777 – 20 October 1850) and Princess Teresa Czartoryska (30 July 1785 – 31 December 1868). Through her father she was great-granddaughter of Prince Stanisław Lubomirski and through her mother she was granddaughter of Prince Józef Klemens Czartoryski. She had two sisters: Dorota and Jadwiga Julia (she married Eugène, 8th Prince of Ligne) and brother Jerzy Henryk.

On 6 July 1829, in Przeworsk she married Prince Władysław Hieronim Sanguszko. They had five children:

- Jadwiga Klementyna Sanguszko (1830–1918) – she married Prince Adam Stanisław Sapieha
- Roman Damian Sanguszko (1832–1917) – he married Countess Karolina of Thun and Hohenstein, great-granddaughter of Count Alois Friedrich von Brühl
- Pawel Roman Sanguszko (1834–1876) – he married firstly Countess Marie Gfn von der Borch-Warkland and secondly Georgina Apponyi de Nagy-Appony
- Helena Sanguszko (1836–1891)
- Eustachy Stanisław Sanguszko (1842–1903) – he married Countess Konstancja Anna Zamoyska

Izabela was a talented musician who studied with Antonio Tamburini and Stefano Pavesi. Scores she purchased are preserved in the National Ossoliński Institute and the Municipal Public Library in Tarnów. She kept a diary of compositions and gave her children a thorough musical education. Izabela died in 1890.

== Ancestry ==
16. Prince Jerzy Aleksander Lubomirski (1666-1735)
8. Prince Stanisław Lubomirski (1704-1793)
17. Countess Joanna Karolina Starzhausen
4. Prince Józef Aleksander Lubomirski (1751-1817)
18. Antoni Pociej (????-1749)
9. Ludwika Honorata Pociej (1726-1786)
19. Rozalia Zahorowska
2. Prince Henryk Ludwik Lubomirski (1777-1850)
20. Marcin Sosnowski
10. Józef Sosnowski (1729-1783)
21. Teofila Kruszyńska
5. Ludwika Sosnowska (1751-1836)
22. Janusz Despot-Zenowicz
11. Tekla Despot-Zenowicz (1731-????)
23. Katarzyny Aleksandrowicz
1. 'Princess Izabela Maria Lubomirska
24. Prince Józef Czartoryski (????-1750)
12. Prince Stanisław Kostka Czartoryski (1700-1766)
25. Countess Teresa Denhoff
6. Prince Józef Klemens Czartoryski (1739-1810)
26. Jakub Zygmunt Rybiński (1685-1725)
13. Anna Józefa Rybińska (????-1778)
27. Helena Joanna Potocka (1693-1761)
3. Princess Teresa Czartoryska (1785-1868)
28. Prince Stanisław Wincenty Jabłonowski (1694-1754)
14. Prince Antoni Barnaba Jabłonowski (1732-1799)
29. Dorota Bronisz (1692-1774)
7. Princess Dorota Barbara Jabłonowska (1760-1844)
30. Prince Paweł Karol Sanguszko (1680-1750)
15. Princess Anna Sanguszko (1739-1765)
31. Countess Barbara Urszula Dunin (1718-1791)
