= Eustachy Sanguszko =

Eustachy Sanguszko may refer to:

- Eustachy Erazm Sanguszko (1768–1844), Polish noble, military commander, diplomat, and politician
- Eustachy Stanisław Sanguszko (1842–1903), Polish noble and politician
