= Jabłonowski (Prus III) =

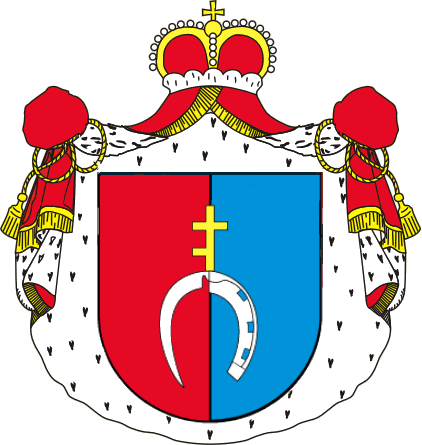
Jabłonowski family coat of arms: Prus III.

The House of Jabłonowski is a distinguished noble family of the Polish–Lithuanian Commonwealth, belonging to szlachta, the historical nobility of Poland.

== History ==
The history of the family starts in the 16th century when members of the Wichulski family purchased the Jabłonowo Pomorskie estate and began to use the name Jabłonowski. The family rose to prominence in the 17th century with Stanisław Jan Jabłonowski, a successful military leader in such campaigns as that against the Swedes during The Deluge, Chocim, the 1683 Battle of Vienna and the 1695 battle against the Tatars at Lwów. During the 1696 election to select a successor for John III Sobieski, Stanisław Jan Jabłonowski was a candidate for the Polish throne. In 1698, Emperor Leopold I granted him and his family the hereditary title of Prince.

Stanisław Jan Jabłonowski was the father of Anna Jabłonowska who was the mother of Polish King Stanisław Leszczyński. Stanisław Leszczyński's daughter Marie Leszczyńska married King Louis XV of France and became, with him, the ancestress of most of the Roman Catholic monarchs of Europe.

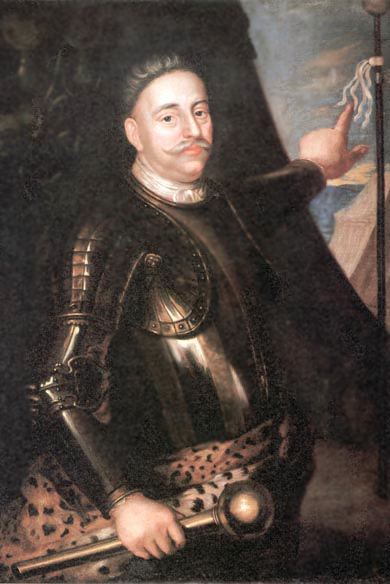
Hetman Stanisław Jan Jabłonowski.

== Coat of arms and motto ==
The Jabłonowski family used the Prus III coat of arms.

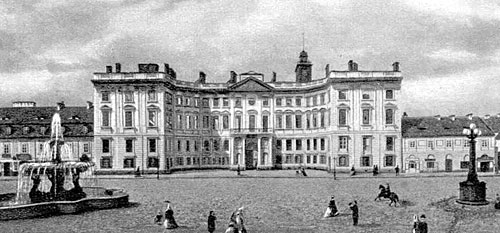
Jabłonowski Palace in Warsaw destroyed in 1944 rebuilt by CitiBank in the 1990s

== Selected family members ==
- Stanisław Jan Jabłonowski (1634–1702), Field and Great Hetman of the Crown
- Anna Jabłonowska (1660–1727), mother of King Stanisław I Leszczyński
- Marianna Jabłonowska (1708–1765), married to Jan Wielopolski
- Aleksander Jan Jabłonowski (?-1733), Great Chorąży
- Józef Aleksander Jabłonowski (1711–1777), Stolnik, voivode
- Antoni Barnaba Jabłonowski (1732–1799), voiode, castellan
- Dorota Barbara Jabłonowska (1760–1844), married to Józef Klemens Czartoryski
- Władysław Franciszek Jabłonowski (1769–1802), Polish and French general.

== See also ==
- Burshtyn Palace
- Jabłonowski

== Gallery ==
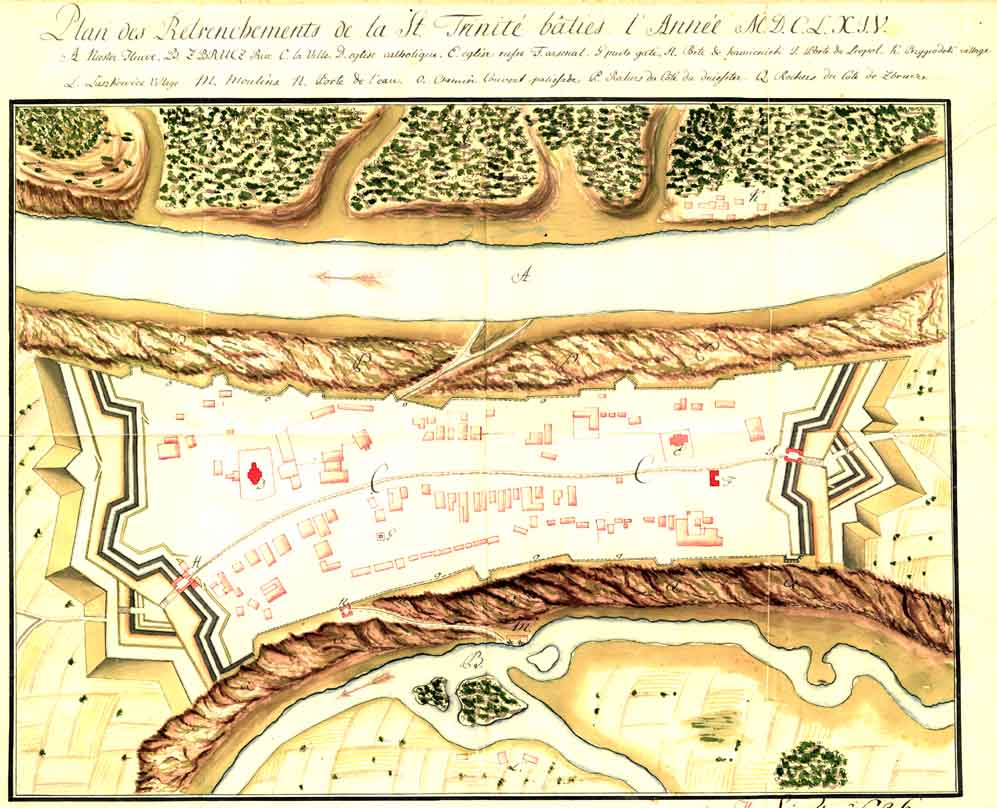
Plan of the Fortifications of the Holy Trinity (Okopy Świętej Trójcy) constructed by Hetman Stanisław Jan Jabłonowski
