= Teresa Czartoryska =

Polish noblewoman (1785–1868)

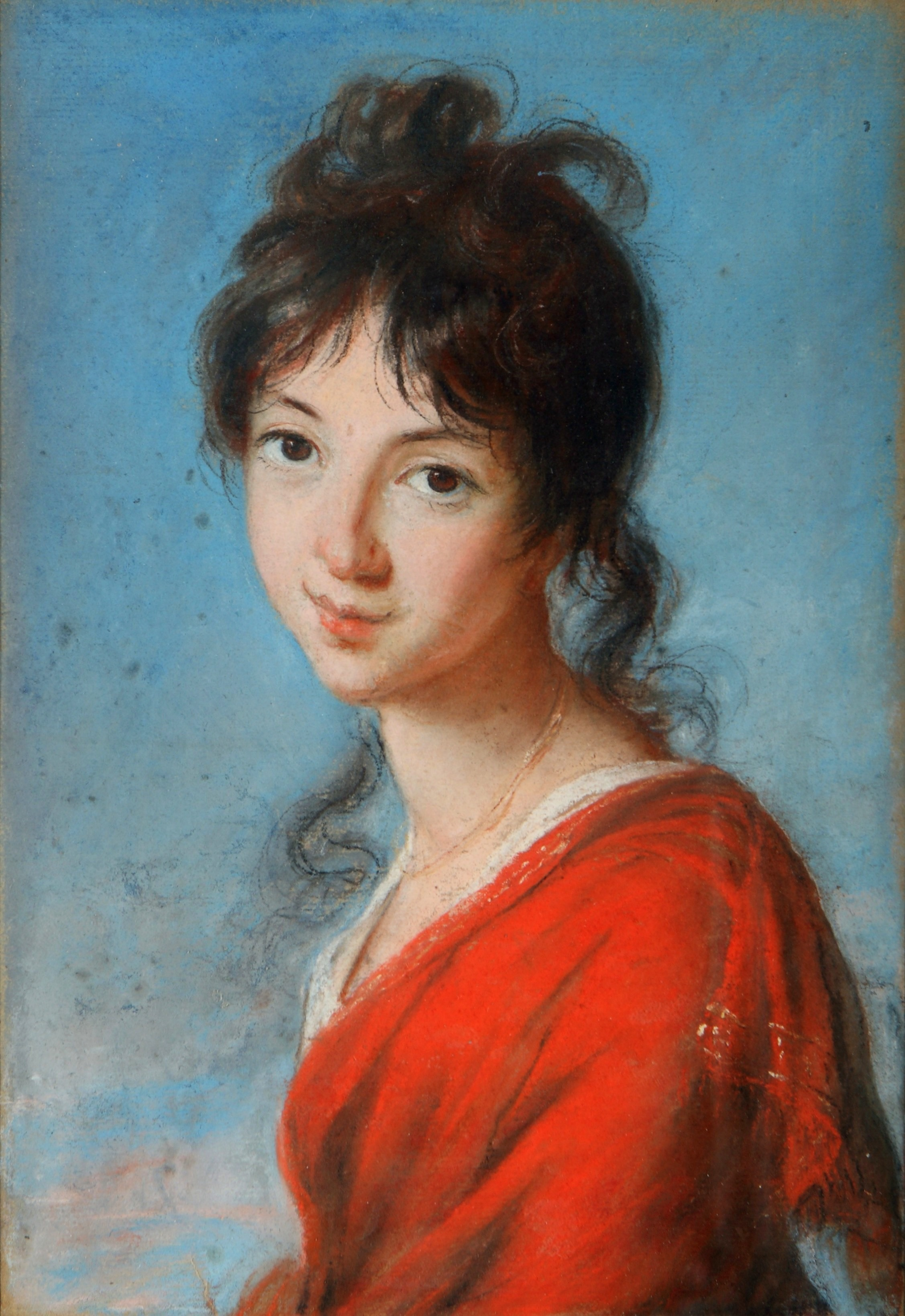
- Teresa Czartoryska by Élisabeth Vigée-Lebrun, 1801
- Born: 13 July 1785; Korzec, Ukraine
- Died: 31 December 1868 (aged 83); Kraków, Poland
- Noble family: Czartoryski
- Spouse: Henryk Ludwik Lubomirski
- Issue: with Henryk Ludwik Lubomirski: Izabela Lubomirska; Jadwiga Lubomirska Jerzy Henryk Lubomirski
- Father: Józef Klemens Czartoryski
- Mother: Dorota Barbara Jabłonowska

Princess Teresa Czartoryska (13 July 1785 - 31 December 1868) was a Polish noblewoman. She was a daughter of Józef Klemens Czartoryski and Dorota Barbara Jabłonowska.

She married Prince Henryk Ludwik Lubomirski (1777–1850) on 24 May 1807.

Her daughter Jadwiga Lubomirska married Eugène, 8th Prince of Ligne in Vienna on 28 October 1836.

== Ancestors ==
Ancestors of Teresa Czartoryska

16. Prince Jan Karol Czartoryski
8. Prince Józef Czartoryski
17. Magdalena Konopacka
4. Prince Stanisław Kostka Czartoryski
18. Count Władysław von Dönhoff
9. Countess Teresa von Dönhoff
19. Konstancja Sluszczanka
2. Prince Józef Klemens Czartoryski
20. ? Rybiński
10. Jakub Zygmunt Rybiński
21. ?
5. Anna Rybińska
22. ? Potocki
11. Helena Joanna Potocka
23. ?
1. Teresa Czartoryska
24. Prince Jan Stanisław Jabłonowski (1669–1731)
12. Prince Stanisław Wincenty Jabłonowski (1694–1754)
25. Jeanne Marie de Béthune (+1731)
6. Prince Antoni Barnaba Jabłonowski (1732–1799)
26. ? Bronisz
13. Dorota Bronisz (1692–1774)
27. ?
3. Princess Dorota Barbara Jabłonowska
28. Hieronim Sanguszko (1651-1684/5)
14. Pawel Karol Sangusko (1682–1750)
29. Konstancja Sapieha (1651–1691)
7. Anna Sanguszko (1739–1766)
30. ? Dunin
15. Barbara Urszula Duninówna (1718–1791)
31. ?
