= Klementyna Czartoryska =

Polish noblewoman (1780–1852)

- Princess
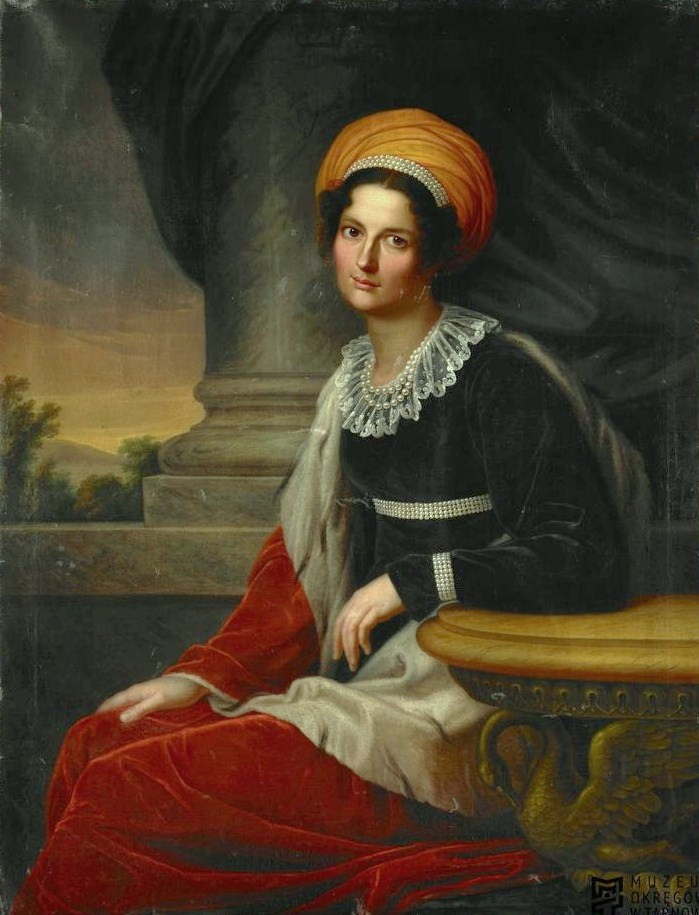
- Coat of arms: Czartoryski
- Born: 30 December 1780; Korzec
- Died: 2 March 1852 (aged 71); Slavuta
- Family: Czartoryski
- Consort: Eustachy Erazm Sanguszko
- Issue: Dorota Sanguszko; Roman Sanguszko; Władysław Hieronim Sanguszko
- Father: Józef Klemens Czartoryski
- Mother: Dorota Barbara Jabłonowska

Princess Klementyna Czartoryska (1780–1852) was a Polish noblewoman, the author of a diary, which has been published.

She was the daughter of Józef Klemens Czartoryski and Dorota Barbara Jabłonowska. She married Prince Eustachy Erazm Sanguszko on 26 June 1798 in Slavuta and had three children: Dorota (1799–1831), Roman (1800–81), and Władysław (1803–70). Her husband, meanwhile, was having an affair with Julia Lubomirska.

When her spouse was accused of treason in 1810, she negotiated with the government and defended his rights. In 1813, she settled in Sławucie, where she collected a great library. She also founded the church St. Dorota in Sławucie. In 1830, she prevented the confiscation of the family property and her son's exile by her friendship with empress Alexandra. Her diary from 1832 to 1835 was published in 1927.

== Ancestors ==
16. Prince Jan Karol Czartoryski
8. Prince Józef Czartoryski
17. Magdalena Konopacka
4. Prince Stanisław Kostka Czartoryski
18. Count Władysław von Dönhoff
9. Countess Teresa von Dönhoff
19. Konstancja Sluszczanka
2. Prince Józef Klemens Czartoryski
20. ? Rybiński
10. Jakub Zygmunt Rybiński
21. ?
5. Anna Rybińska
22. ? Potocki
11. Helena Joanna Potocka
23. ?
1. Princess Klementyna Czartoryska (1780–1852)
24. Prince Jan Stanisław Jabłonowski (1669-1731)
12. Prince Stanisław Wincenty Jabłonowski (1694-1754)
25. Jeanne Marie de Béthune (+1731)
6. Prince Antoni Barnaba Jabłonowski (1732-1799)
26. ? Bronisz
13. Dorota Bronisz (1692-1774)
27. ?
3. Princess Dorota Barbara Jabłonowska (1760–1844)
28. Hieronim Sanguszko (1651-1684/5)
14. Pawel Karol Sangusko (1682-1750)
29. Konstancja Sapieha (1651-1691)
7. Anna Sanguszko (1739-1766)
30. ? Dunin
15. Barbara Urszula Duninówna (1718-1791)
31. ?
