= Eustachy Stanisław Sanguszko =

Polish noble and politician (1842–1903)

- Prince
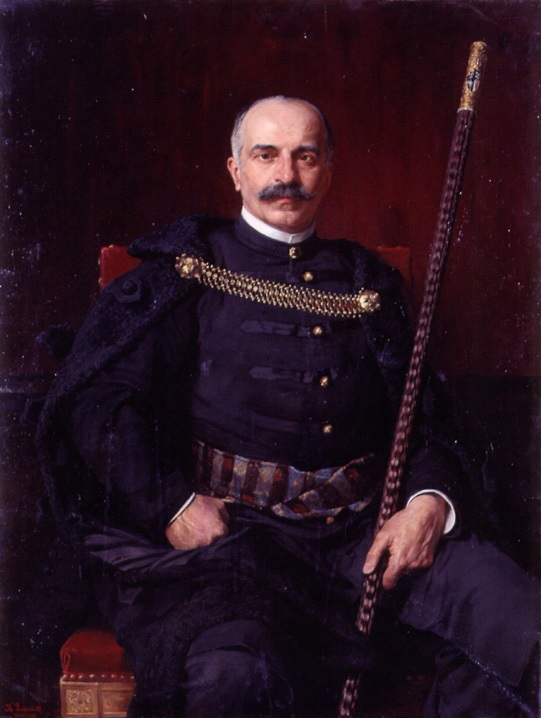

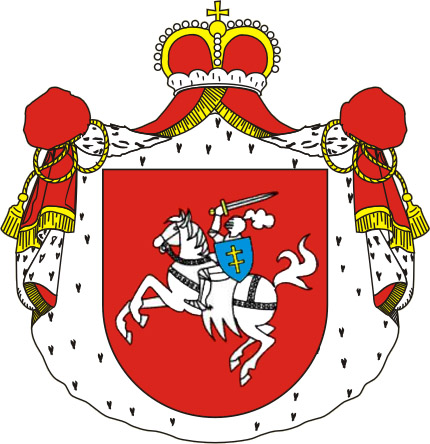
- Coat of arms: Pogoń Litewska coat of arms
- Born: 13 July 1842; Tarnów
- Died: 2 April 1903 (aged 60); Bozen Gries, Austria
- Family: Sanguszko
- Consort: Konstancja Maria Zamoyska
- Issue: Roman Władysław Sanguszko
- Father: Władysław Hieronim Sanguszko
- Mother: Izabella Maria Lubomirska

Prince Eustachy Stanisław Sanguszko (28 August 1842 – 2 April 1903) was a Polish noble (szlachcic) and conservative politician.

Eustachy educated in Poland and Paris in 1859–1860. He studied law at the Jagiellonian University from 1862 to 1864. He sympathized with the insurgents of the January Uprising of 1863–1864 and took part in meetings in Goszcz. In April 1863 he traveled with a secret correspondence for the "Hôtel Lambert" to Paris, and stayed there until the end of the Uprising. From 1873 until 1901 member and from 14 October 1890 to 9 February 1895 Marshal of the National Sejm in Galicia. He was member of the Herrenhaus and member of the Austrian Council of the State from 27 October 1879. Successor of Kazimierz Feliks Badeni in the office of governor of Galicia from 1895 until 1898.

== Awards ==
- Grand Cordon of the Leopold Order, awarded in 1894 (Wielka Wstega Orderu Leopolda)
- Order of the Golden Fleece, awarded in 1898

== Family ==
He is Prince Władysław Leon Sapieha's maternal uncle. So Prince Eustachy Stanisław Sanguszko is a 5th generation uncle of Queen Mathilde of Belgium.
