= Czaplic =

Czaplic (feminine: Czaplicówna, plural Czaplicowie) is a Polish surname. Notable people with the surname include:

- Celestyn Czaplic (1723–1804), Polish nobleman, politician, writer and a poet
- Eufemiusz Czaplic (1768–1825), Polish nobleman, general of the Russian Empire
- Tekla Czaplicówna (Czaplic) (1758–1820), Polish noble lady, daughter of Celestyn Czaplic (1723–1804) wife of Antoni Barnaba Jabłonowski
