= Leon Aleksander Sapieha =

Polish military aviator and landowner

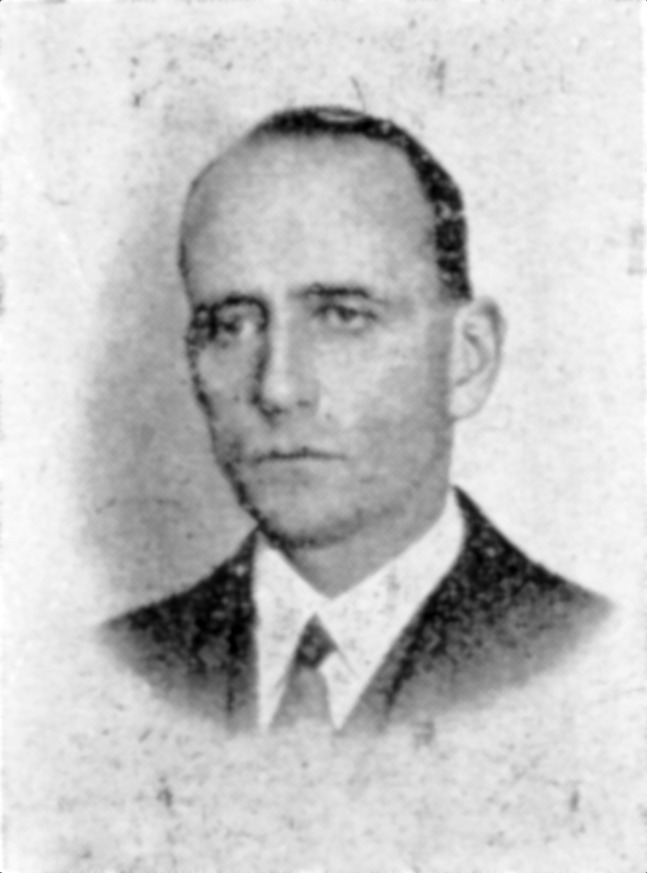
- Coat of arms: Lis
- Born: 12 December 1883; Krasiczyn, Kingdom of Galicia and Lodomeria (present-day Poland)
- Died: 27 September 1944 (aged 60); Rzeszów, Nazi Germany (present-day Poland)
- Noble family: Sapieha
- consort: Katarzyna Iza Potocka
- Father: Prince Władysław Sapieha
- Mother: Countess Elżbieta Potulicka

Prince Leon Aleksander Sapieha (1883-1944) was a Polish military aviator, landowner, traveler, and a member of the Sejm.

His brother was Prince Adam Zygmunt Sapieha and his uncle the Polish cardinal Prince Adam Stefan Sapieha.

== Bibliography ==
- Alina Szklarska-Lohmannowa: Sapieha Leon. W: Polski Słownik Biograficzny. T. 35. Warszawa – Kraków: Polska Akademia Nauk – Instytut Historii im. Tadeusza Manteuffla, 1994, s. 81–83. ISBN 8386301023.
