= Burshtyn Palace =

Former palace of the Skarbek and Jablonowski families in Burshtyn, Ukraine

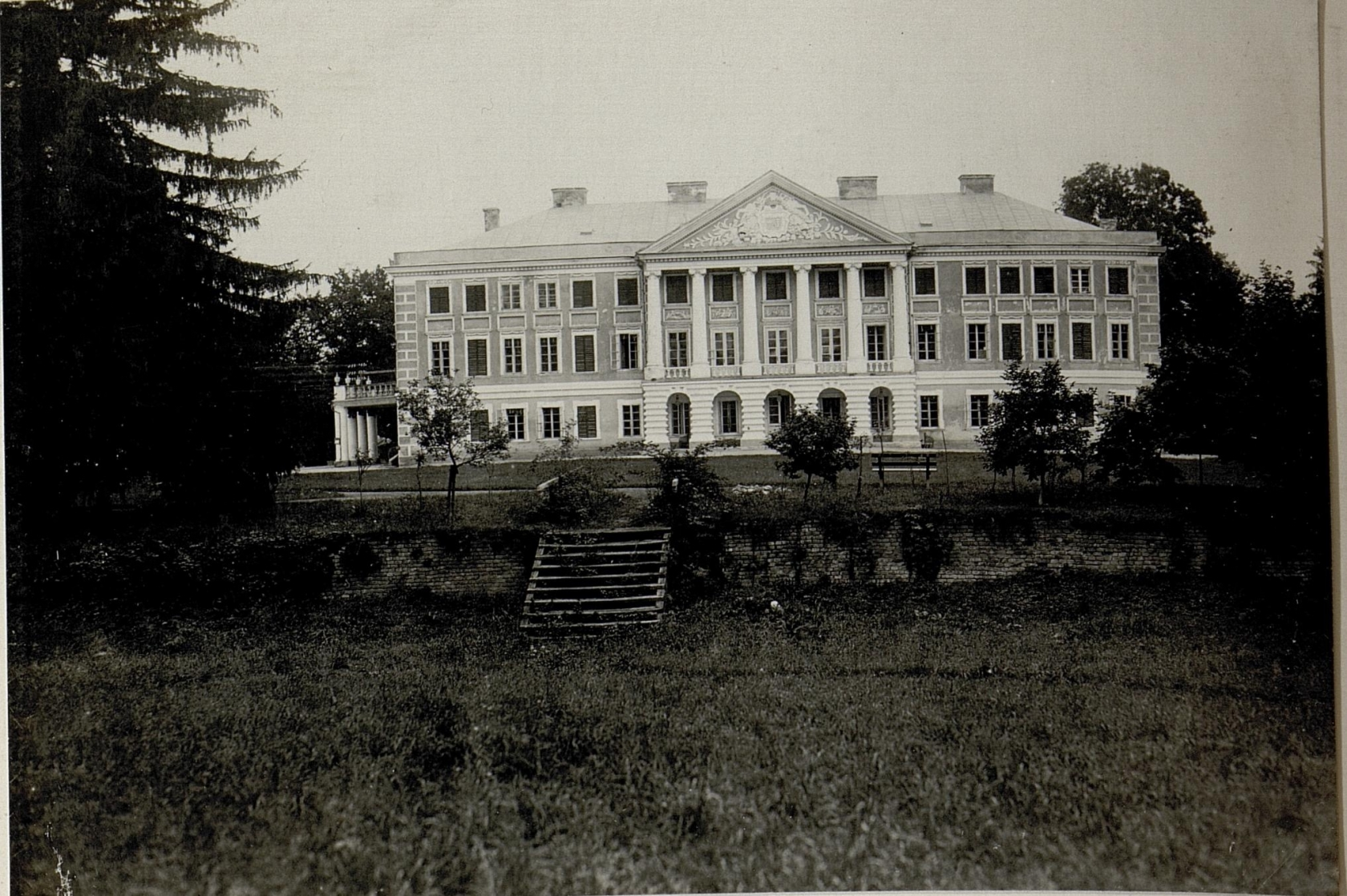
Burshtyn Palace on 29 September 1916, pictured during a visit of Austrian Archduke Charles (later Emperor Charles I)

The Burshtyn Palace or Skarbek–Jablonowski Palace (Ukrainian: Палац Скарбеків–Яблоновських; Polish: Pałac Skarbków–Jabłonowskich w Bursztynie) was a neoclassical palace in Burshtyn (formerly Bursztyn/Bursztýn), Ivano-Frankivsk Oblast, in western Ukraine. Constructed in the early decades of the 19th century for the Skarbek family and later inherited by the princes Jabłonowski, it was one of the most prominent magnate residences in eastern Galicia. The palace was heavily damaged during the First World War and did not survive the 20th century; today nothing remains above ground of the original complex.

== History ==
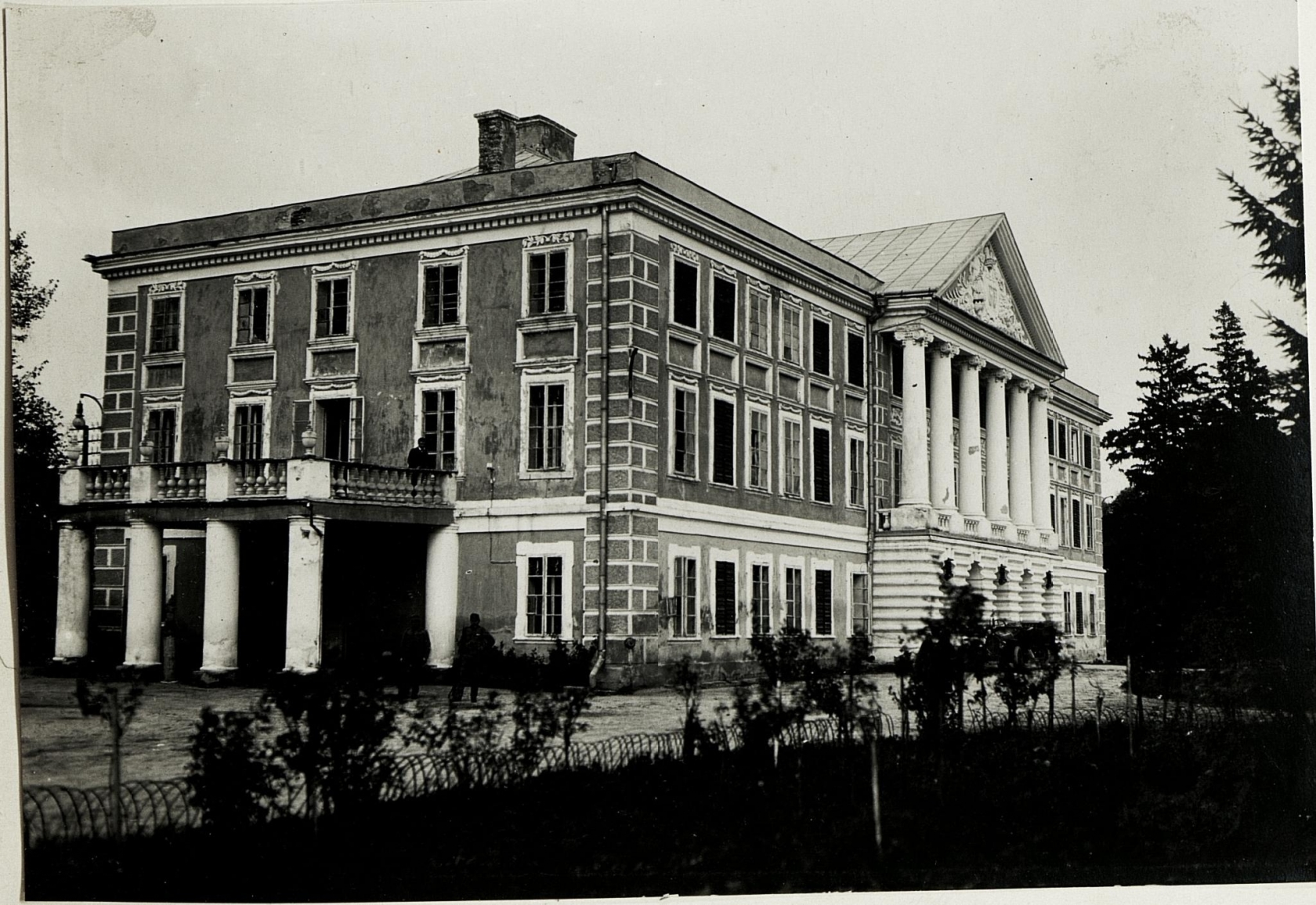
Burshtyn Palace in September 1916

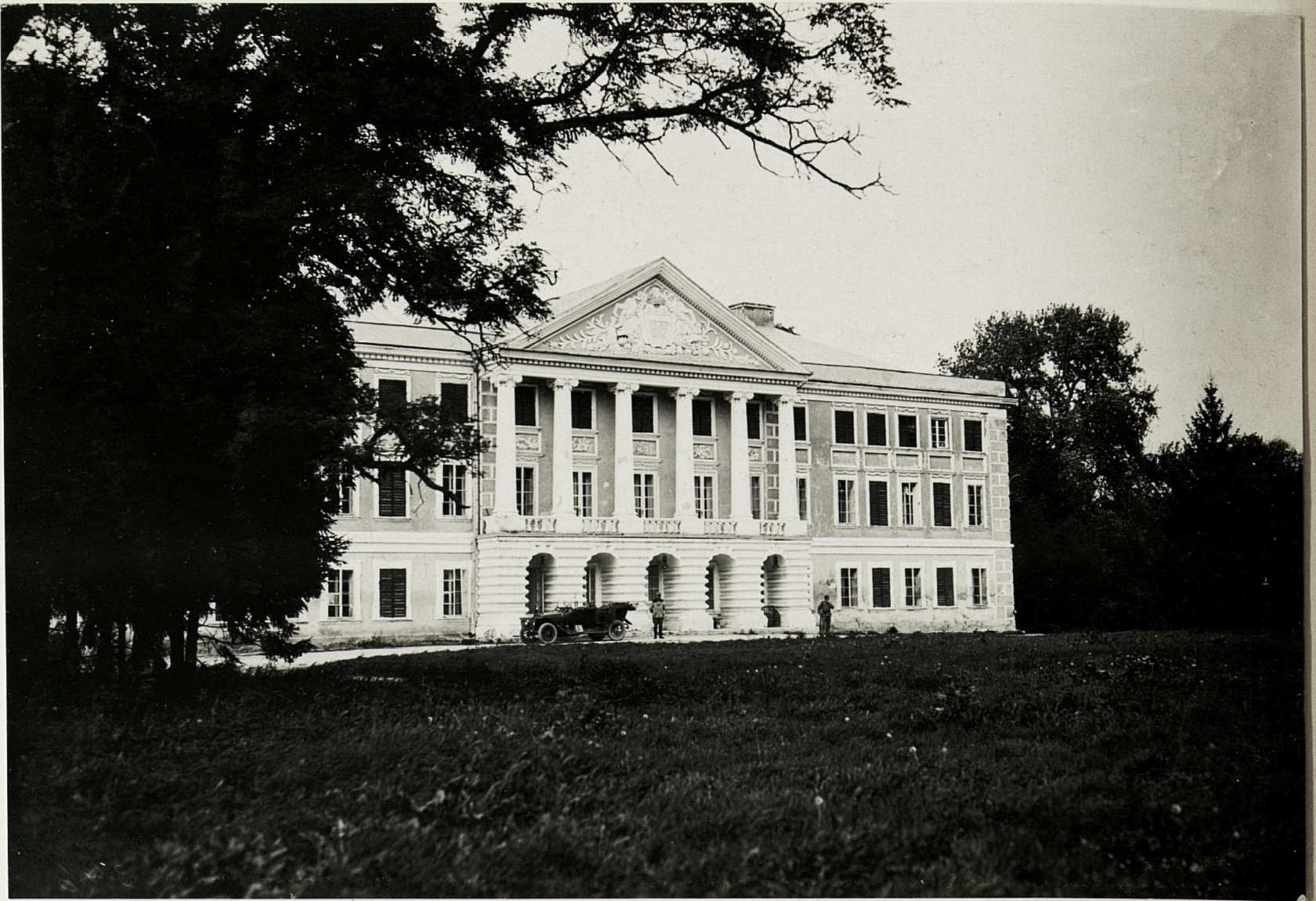
Burshtyn Palace in September 1916

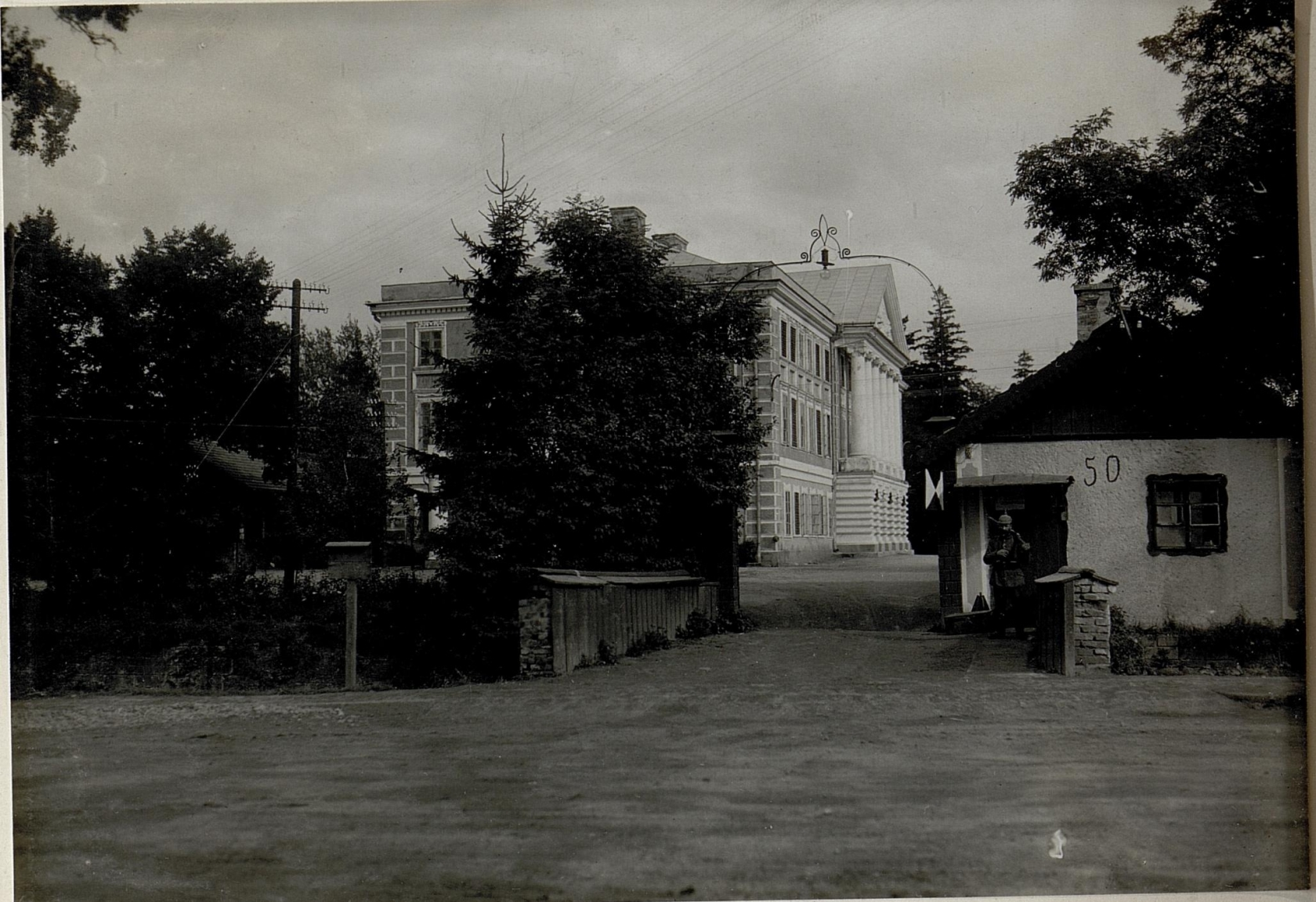
Burshtyn Palace in September 1916

=== Origins under the Skarbek family ===
Burshtyn formed part of a large, landed estate belonging to the Skarbek family, a notable Galician noble lineage. The palace was erected in the first half of the 19th century by Ignacy Skarbek, the local landowner (dziedzic). Heraldic decoration recorded on the façades—including the Abdank and Pilawa coats of arms associated with the Skarbek and Potocki families—supports the attribution of the building to this period.

The design of the palace showed close stylistic affinities with other classical foundations of the Skarbek family, most notably the Skarbek Theatre (now the Maria Zankovetska Theatre) in Lviv, completed in the 1840s. This has led local historians to link the palace to the broader architectural patronage network of Count Stanisław Skarbek, Ignacy’s younger brother, although no direct documentation of the architect has been preserved.

=== Transition to the Jabłonowski family ===
Ignacy Skarbek bequeathed the estate, including the palace, to his daughter Eleonora. In 1834, she married Prince Karol Jabłonowski, bringing the Burshtyn estate into the possession of the Jabłonowski family. Throughout the late 19th and early 20th centuries the palace was commonly referred to as the Palace of the Princes Jabłonowski, although the core structure predated their ownership.

During this period the residence served as the administrative and social centre of the estate. The surrounding park, arboretum and outbuildings were expanded, and the interior was furnished with paintings, mirrors, clocks and other decorative arts collected by the family.

Later the estate passed to their son Stanisław Jabłonowski, but according to local accounts he neglected the property, and reportedly died by suicide in his study — allegedly burdened by debts accumulated from gambling. The estate next passed to his son (also named Stanisław), who married a countess in 1905; they built a separate family villa next to the palace, known locally as the “small Jabłonowski palace” (the “Yadviga” villa).

=== First World War ===
Burshtyn lay in a strategic zone near the Zolota Lypa river, the site of heavy fighting during the Battle of Galicia in 1914. The town suffered multiple occupations and significant destruction.

Damage sustained during the war, including bombardment and fires affecting the town centre, left the palace structurally compromised. The family temporarily left (some moved to Kraków), and the palace was reportedly used by Russian forces: one hall was turned into a hospital for the wounded, another into a stable for horses.

After the end of hostilities, the family returned and attempted to repair the war damage. Local memory claims that the palace survived thanks to old, mature trees whose trunks absorbed much of the artillery damage. However, much of the interior and inventory was already destroyed or looted.

==== World War I Ottoman Headquarters ====
In 1916, during the Brusilov Offensive, the palace gained particular military significance: it served as the headquarters of the XV Corps of the Ottoman Army, which had been deployed to Galicia to support Austro-Hungarian forces. Contemporary military photographs identify the building as Schloss Bursztyn, Command Post of the 15th Turkish Corps, making it one of the main Ottoman staff centres on the Eastern Front. Archduke Charles of Austria (later Emperor Charles I) met with Ottoman commanders, such as Cevat Çobanlı, in the vicinity of Burshtyn during this period.

The presence of Ottoman units in Burshtyn is further attested by the location of a Turkish military cemetery nearby. This makes the palace one of the few documented Ottoman military headquarters on the Eastern Front and an unusual example of Austro-Hungarian–Ottoman wartime cooperation in Galicia.

=== Interwar decline and destruction ===
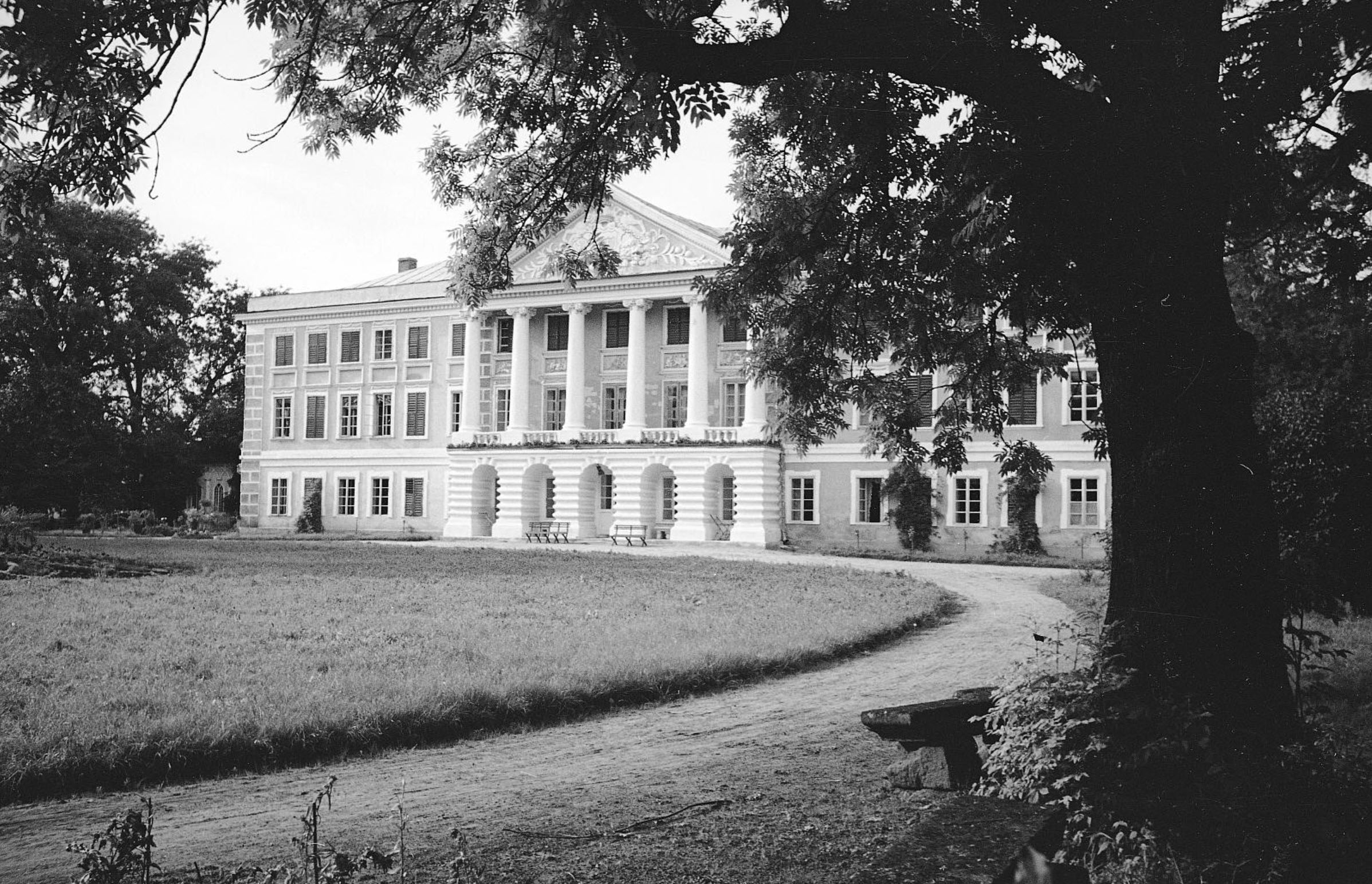
Burshtyn Palace in 1938

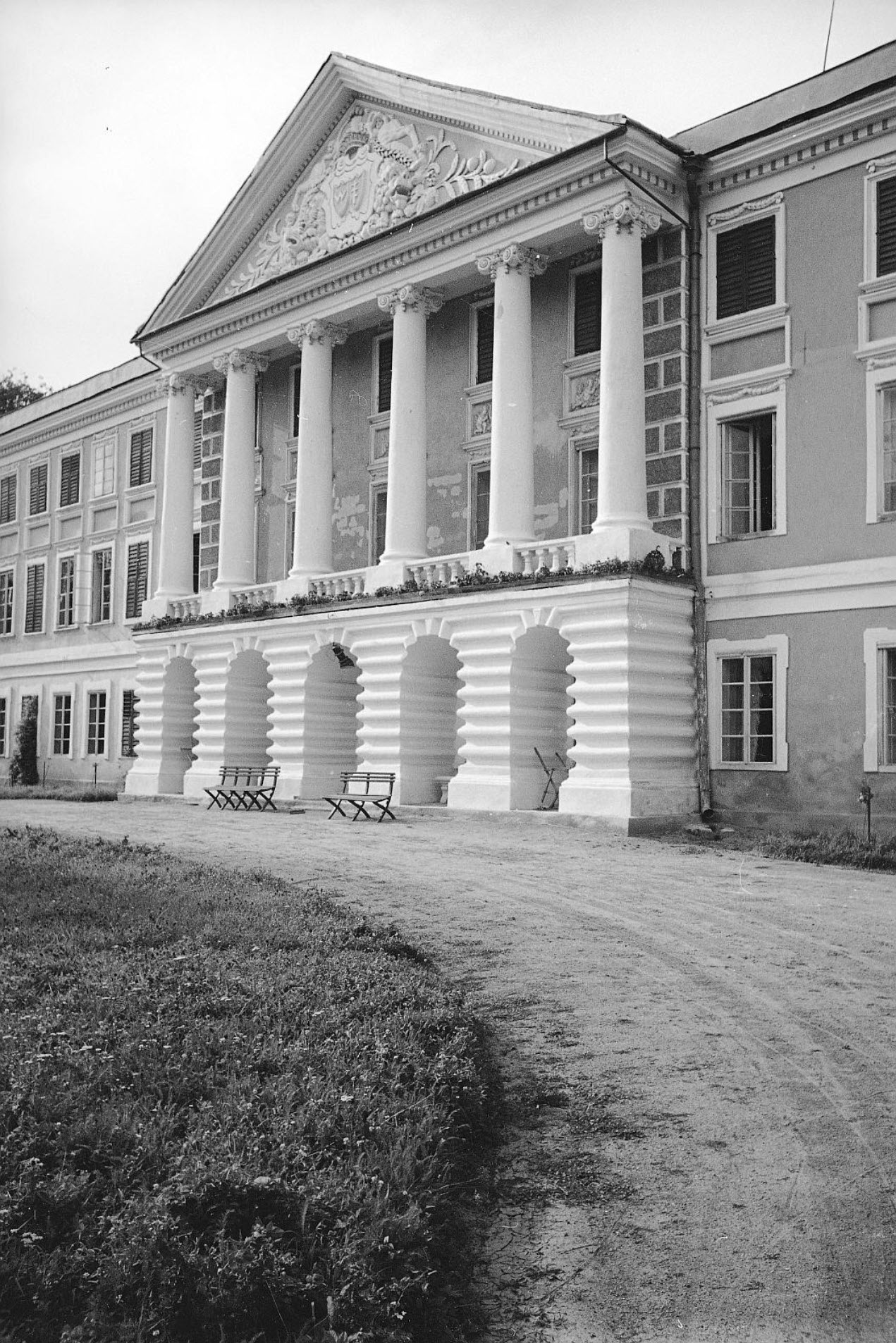
Burshtyn Palace in 1938

After the collapse of Austria-Hungary, Bursztýn was incorporated into the Second Polish Republic. The palace remained in the possession of the Jabłonowski family. In the 1930s, ownership passed to the eldest daughter of Stanisław Jabłonowski, Karolina, who married baron Adam Heydel. The couple began efforts to restore the dilapidated palace. The outbreak of the Second World War disrupted these plans. In 1939, the estate was nationalised following the Soviet occupation of eastern Poland. The palace was sacked by the Russians. Archival documents and family papers were removed to Lviv or lost. The Heydel family and their children fled to Poland fearing reprisal and prison camps.

=== Current condition ===
During the Second World War the abandoned structure deteriorated further. By the late 1940s the building had been stripped of its furnishings and served as a grain warehouse for a collective farm, then it fell into disuse and was left in ruins. In 1955, the authorities demolished the palace entirely and the bricks were reused elsewhere. The site was redeveloped, and no physical traces of the palace survive today. The palace is known today only through early 20th-century photographs, local histories, and surviving archival materials in Lviv and elsewhere.

The Skarbek–Jablonowski family chapel-tomb (built 1813) in the town cemetery remains the only extant architectural element associated with the family’s presence in Burshtyn.

== Architecture ==
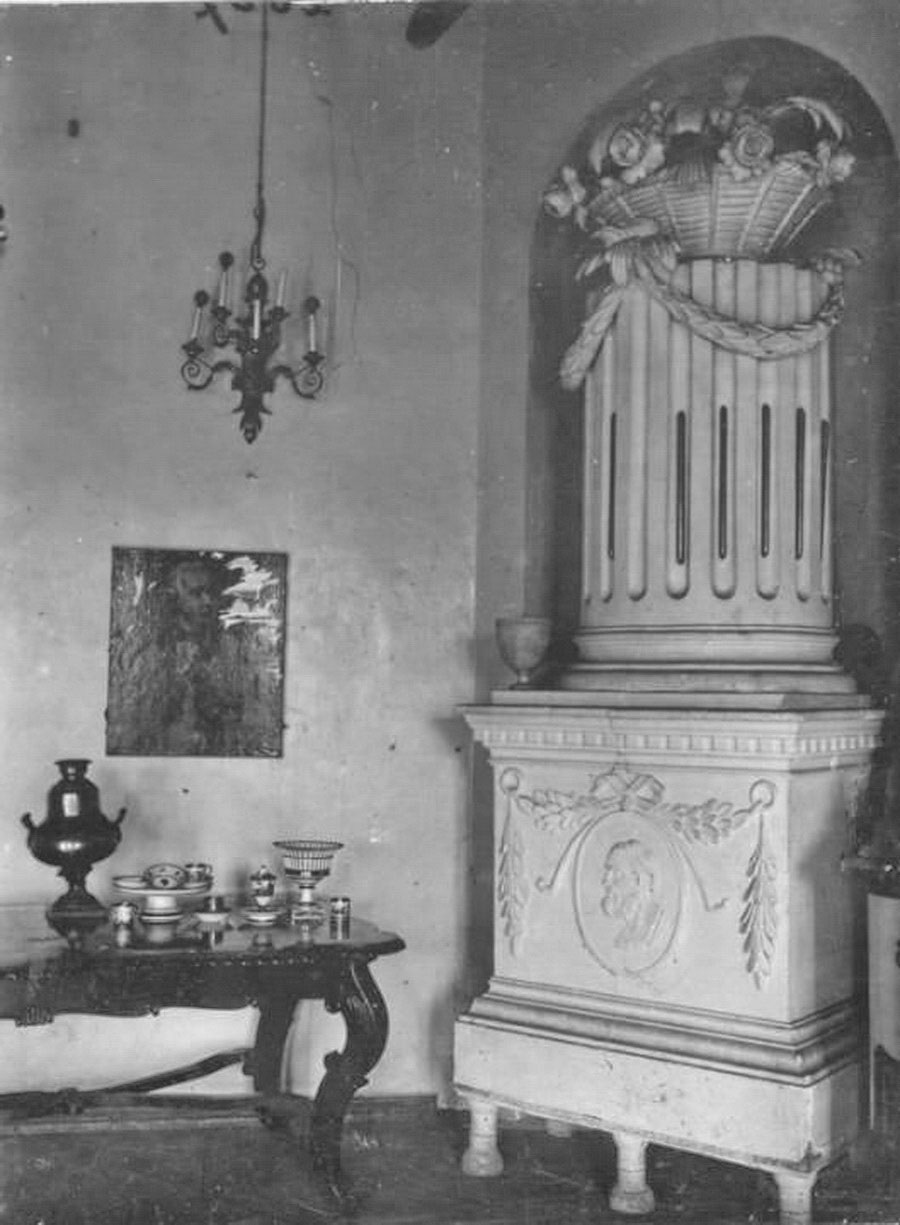
A ceramic stove at Burshtyn Palace

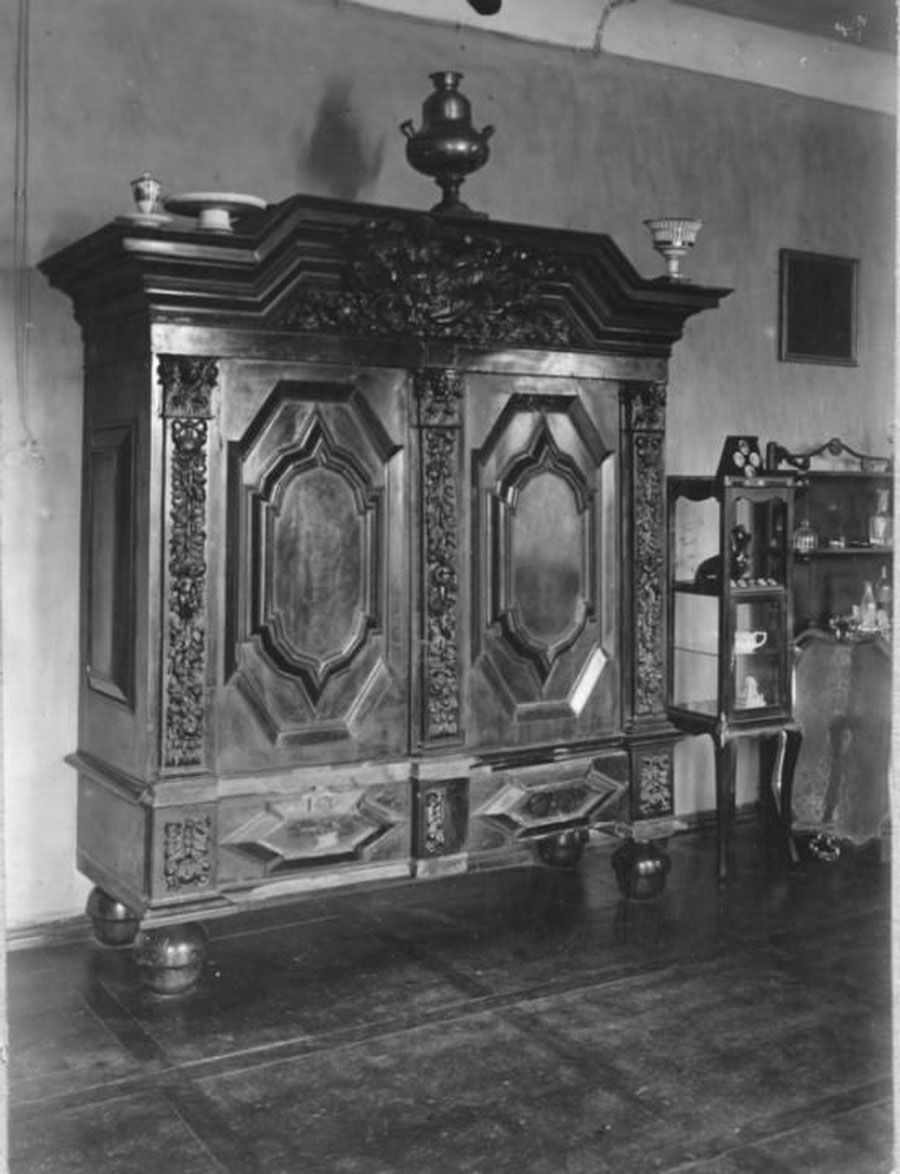
A large wooden cabinet at Burshtyn Palace

=== Exterior ===
The palace was a three-storey neoclassical residence constructed on a rectangular plan. Its most striking feature was a monumental portico of tall classical columns, supporting a triangular pediment. Behind the colonnade lay a broad balcony at the level of the piano nobile. The façade was articulated with evenly spaced windows framed by simple classical architraves, and the ground floor featured rusticated detailing.

Historic photographs show additional side bays and secondary entrances, confirming a layout typical of early 19th-century magnate palaces in Galicia influenced by Viennese and Lviv classicism.

=== Interiors ===
The palace contained an exceptionally rich interior ensemble centred on a library of nearly 10,000 volumes, including rare prints. Its state rooms and salons were furnished with European paintings (by Albani, Buberman, Ender, Lampi the Elder, and Grass), large carved mirrors (one of which survives, though now stripped of its family coat of arms), clocks by foreign makers, and a variety of high-quality artistic objects. Period descriptions and surviving photographs further document ornate ceramic stoves decorated with classical and floral motifs, as well as carved woodwork and Empire-style furnishings, all of which reflected the cultivated taste of the Skarbek–Jabłonowski household. Although the palace suffered extensive losses during and after the First World War, a portion of its movable heritage—furniture, artworks and decorative pieces—was preserved and later transferred to the Ivano-Frankivsk Regional Museum.

== Gardens and park ==
The residence stood within a landscaped park and arboretum, noted in memoirs for ornamental plantings, including a distinctive tree-lined arbour in the shape of a heart. The setting reflected both romantic-era taste and the estate’s economic function as a managed rural domain.
