= Władysław Hieronim Sanguszko =

Polish nobleman and landowner (1803–1870)

- Prince
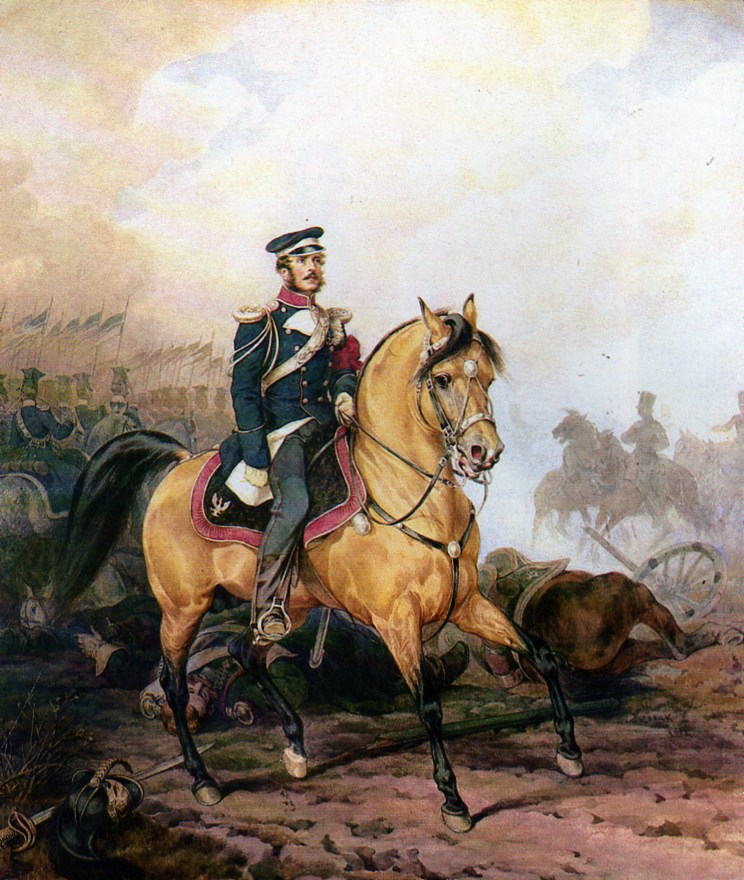
- Coat of arms: Pogoń Litewska
- Born: 20 September 1803; Slavuta, Russian Empire
- Died: 15 April 1870 (aged 66); Cannes, France
- Noble family: Sanguszko
- Consort: Princess Izabella Maria Lubomirska
- Father: Prince Eustachy Erazm Sanguszko
- Mother: Princess Klementyna Czartoryska

Prince Władysław Hieronim Sanguszko (20 September 1803 – 15 April 1870) was a Polish nobleman (szlachcic), landowner, and conservative politician.

Władysław participated in the November Uprising in 1830–1831. He was owner of Gumniśki estate and ran there an Arabian horse stud farm. From 1861 to 1869 member of the National Sejm in Galicia and member of the Herrenhaus. An opposite of the January Uprising of 1863–1864. Since 1854 chairman of the "Society of Friends of Arts" in Kraków.

== Family ==
He was married to his maternal first cousin Princess Izabella Maria Lubomirska and had six children:

- Jadwiga Klementyna Sanguszko (28 October 1830 – 13 June 1918), who married Adam Stanisław Sapieha, and had seven children, including Władisław Leon and Adam Stefan Sapieha.
- Roman Damian Sanguszko (17 October 1832 – 11 January 1917), who married Karoline von Thun-Hohenstein.
- Pawel Roman Sanguszko (30 July 1834 – 15 July 1876), who married Maria Borch and had a daughter.
- Helena Marianna Sanguszko (15 April 1836 – 22 April 1891)
- Eustachy Stanisław Sanguszko (13 July 1842 – 2 April 1903), who married Konstancja Zamojski, and had a son.
- Anna Theophilia Sanguszko (1858 – 1912)

His older brother Prince Roman Sanguszko was compelled to walk the entire way to Siberia (about 3300 km) in chains for his part in the November Uprising by personal order of the Russian Czar.

== Works ==
- O sztuce chowu koni i utrzymaniu stada, 1850
