= Józef Aleksander Jabłonowski =

Polish nobleman

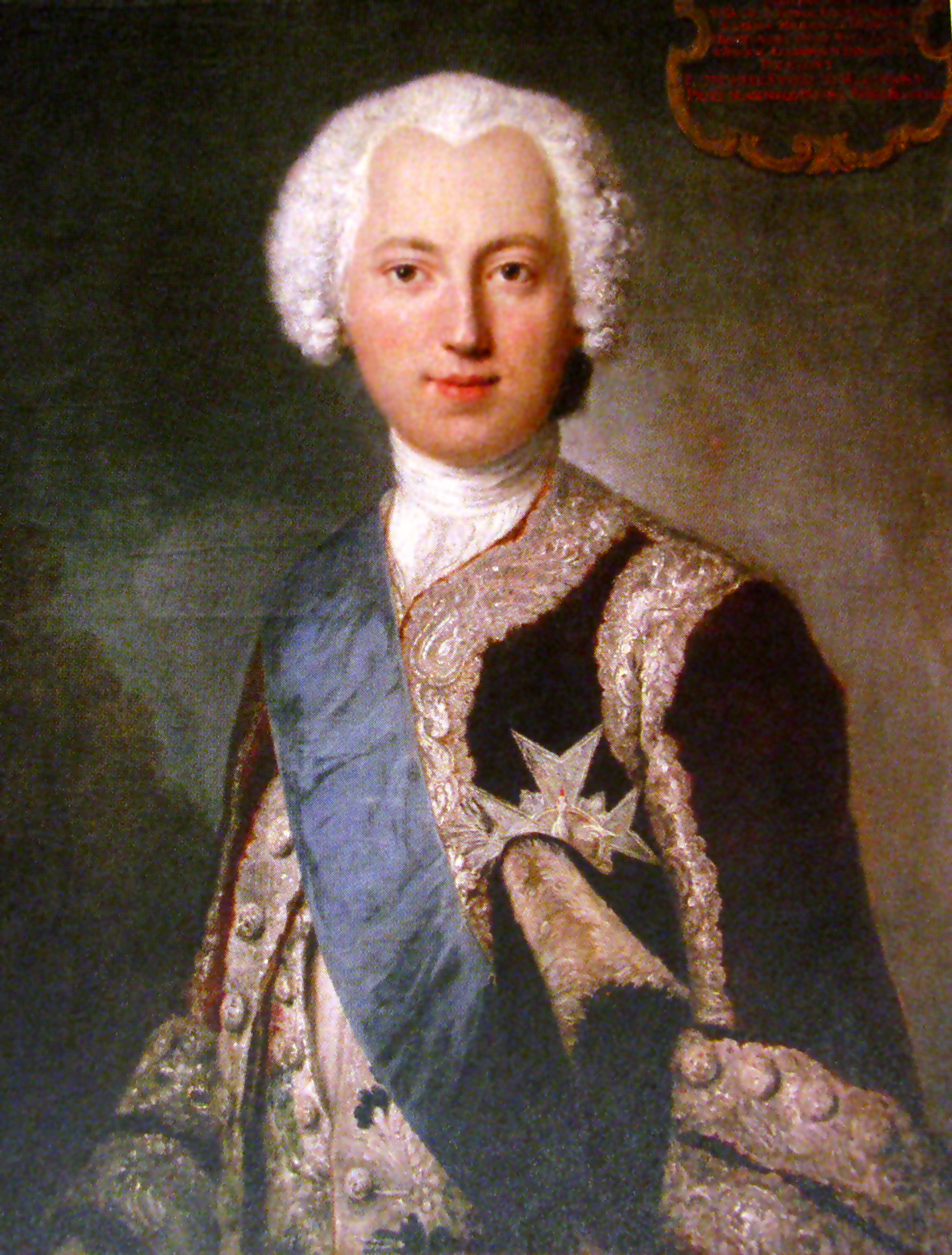
- Coat of arms: Prus III
- Born: 4 February 1711; Tychomlu, Volhynia
- Died: 1 March 1777 (aged 66); Leipzig, Germany
- Noble family: Jabłonowski
- Spouses: Karolina Teresa Radziwiłł; Franciszka Wiktoria Woroniecka
- Issue: with Karolina Teresa Radziwiłł; Teofilia Strzyżsława Jabłonowska; Anna Dobrogniewa Jabłonowska with Franciszka Wiktoria Woroniecka; August Dobrogost Jabłonowski
- Father: Aleksander Jan Jabłonowski
- Mother: Teofilia Sieniawska

Prince Józef Aleksander Jabłonowski (4 February 1711–1777) was a Polish nobleman (szlachcic).

Józef became Stolnik of Lithuania in 1744, voivode of Nowogródek Voivodeship from 1755 to 1772 and starost of Busk, Ukraine, Korsuń, Zvenyhorodka, Wołpenia, Rakancin and Ławara. He founded the Societas Jablonoviana (Towarzystwo Naukowe Jablonowskich) – "Science Society of the Jablonowski Family".

He died in 1777 and was buried in the Pleissenburg Castle in Leipzig, Germany.
