= Aleksander Jan Jabłonowski =

Polish nobleman (died 1723)

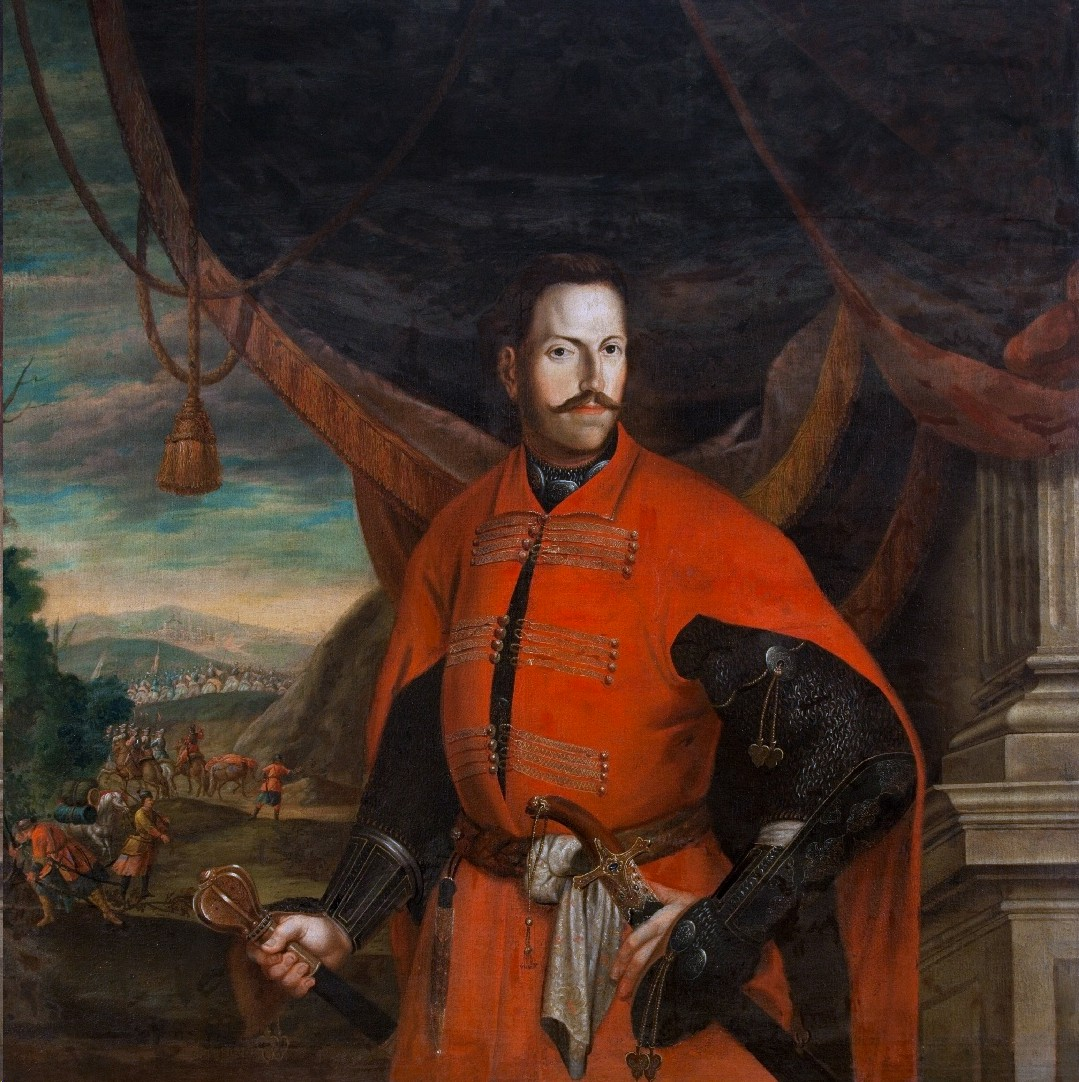
- Coat of arms: Prus III
- Died: 1723; Busk, Ukraine
- Noble family: Jabłonowski
- Spouse: Teofilia Sieniawska
- Issue: Józef Aleksander Jabłonowski; Marianna Jabłonowska; Jadwiga Jabłonowska
- Father: Stanisław Jan Jabłonowski
- Mother: Marianna Kazanowska

Prince Aleksander Jan Jabłonowski (died 1723) was a Polish nobleman.

Aleksander became Great Chorąży of the Crown in 1693 and starost of Korsuń, Busk, Ukraine and Zvenyhorodka.
