= Józef Aleksander Lubomirski =

Polish noble (1751–1817)

- Prince
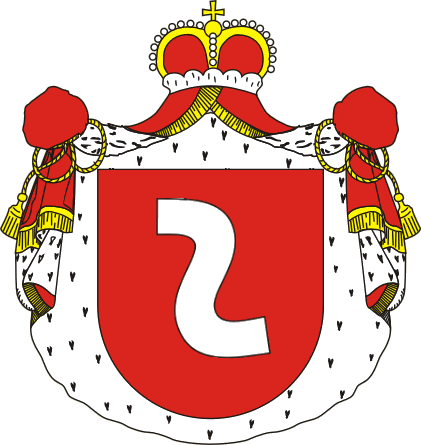
- Coat of arms: Lubomirski
- Born: 1751
- Died: July 1817 (aged 65–66); Rowne
- Family: Lubomirski
- Consort: Ludwika Sosnowska
- Issue: Henryk Ludwik Lubomirski Fryderyk Wilhelm; Władysław Lubomirski; Karol Lubomirski Adelaida Lubomirska
- Father: Stanisław Lubomirski
- Mother: Ludwika Honorata Pociej

Józef Aleksander Lubomirski (1751–1817) was a Polish noble (szlachcic) and a magnate. He was Lieutenant General of the Polish Army, castellan of Kiev and Starost of Romanów (1774–1817)

Son of Stanisław Lubomirski, Voivode of the Kiev Voivodeship and the Bratslav Voivodeship, brother of Michał Lubomirski, Lieutenant General of the Polish Army himself too, heir of Równe and its dependences.

Married to Ludwika Sosnowska, once loved by Tadeusz Kościuszko.

From 1774, he is Starost of Romanów (1774–1817) and armored regiment commander. Between 1786 and 1788, Head of the 12th Royal Regiment of Infantry, later the 5th Royal Regiment of Infantry. Lieutenant General from 1792.

He supported the "Constitution of May 3, 1791", but hadn't fought for its defense, saying he was sick in August He remained in service at Targowica at the time, assigned to the 4th Division de Kamieniec Podolski. But soon retrograded due to lack of knowledge of the service line.

From 1790 to 1795, he was Castellan of Kiev.

He was one of the richest Polish magnates and pioneer of the country's industrialization. He assumed factories such as pottery factories in Korzec. He was an active freemason.

He was:

- Member of the Great Sejm,
- Knight of the Order of Saint Hubert,
- Knight of the Order of Saint Stanislaus (1776),
- Knight of the Order of the White Eagle (1791).

His son, Prince Henryk Ludwik Lubomirski (1777–1850), married Teresa Czartoryska (1785–1868), daughter of Prince Józef Klemens Czartoryski (1740–1810).

== Ancestors ==
16. Prince Jerzy Sebastian Lubomirski
8. Prince Aleksander Michał Lubomirski
17. Konstancja Ligęza
4. Prince Jerzy Aleksander Lubomirski
18. Prince Paweł Jan Sapieha
9. Princess Katarzyna Anna Sapieha
19. Anna Barbara Kopeć
2. Prince Stanisław Lubomirski (1704–1793)
5. Joanna von Starzhausen
1. Prince Józef Aleksander Lubomirski (1751–1817)
3. Ludwika Honorata Pociej
