= Krzemiński =

Krzemiński is a Polish surname. Notable people with the surname include:

- Adam Krzemiński (born 1945), Polish journalist and commentator
- Kazimierz Krzemiński (1902–1940), Polish cyclist
- Wojciech Krzemiński (1933–2017), Polish astronomer
