= Henryk Ludwik Lubomirski =

Polish noble (1777–1850)

- Prince
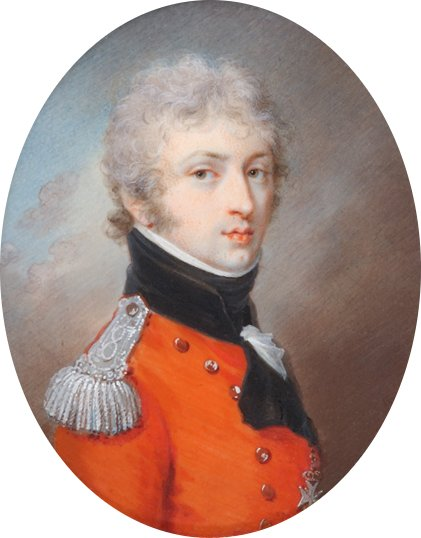

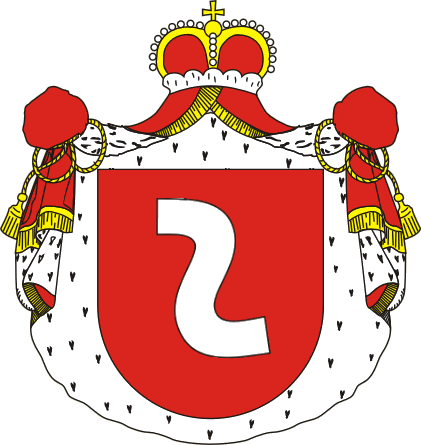
- Coat of arms: Lubomirski
- Born: September 15, 1777; Równe
- Died: October 20, 1850 (aged 73); Drezno
- Family: Lubomirski
- Consort: Teresa Czartoryska
- Issue: Dorota Lubomirska Izabela Maria Lubomirska; Jadwiga Julia Wanda Lubomirska Jerzy Henryk Lubomirski
- Father: Józef Aleksander Lubomirski
- Mother: Ludwika Sosnowska

Prince Henryk Ludwik Lubomirski (15 September 1777 – 20 October 1850) was a Polish noble (szlachcic), magnate, political activist and patron of the arts. He sat for portraits at the age of nine.

== Life ==
He was the son of Józef Aleksander Lubomirski and Ludwika Sosnowska. In 1807, he married Teresa Czartoryska (1785–1868), daughter of Prince Józef Klemens Czartoryski (1740–1810).

He served as Prefect of the Kraków Department of the Duchy of Warsaw in 1810. In 1813, he established the Przesąd Zwyciężony masonic lodge. In 1823, he founded the Lubomirski Princes Museum in Lviv (it was officially re-established in 1995 and is now part of Ossolineum in Wrocław).

He was the great-grandfather of Cardinal Adam Stefan Sapieha.

== See also ==
- Lubomirski family
- Szlachta
