= Stanisław Jan Jabłonowski =

Polish nobleman (1634–1702)

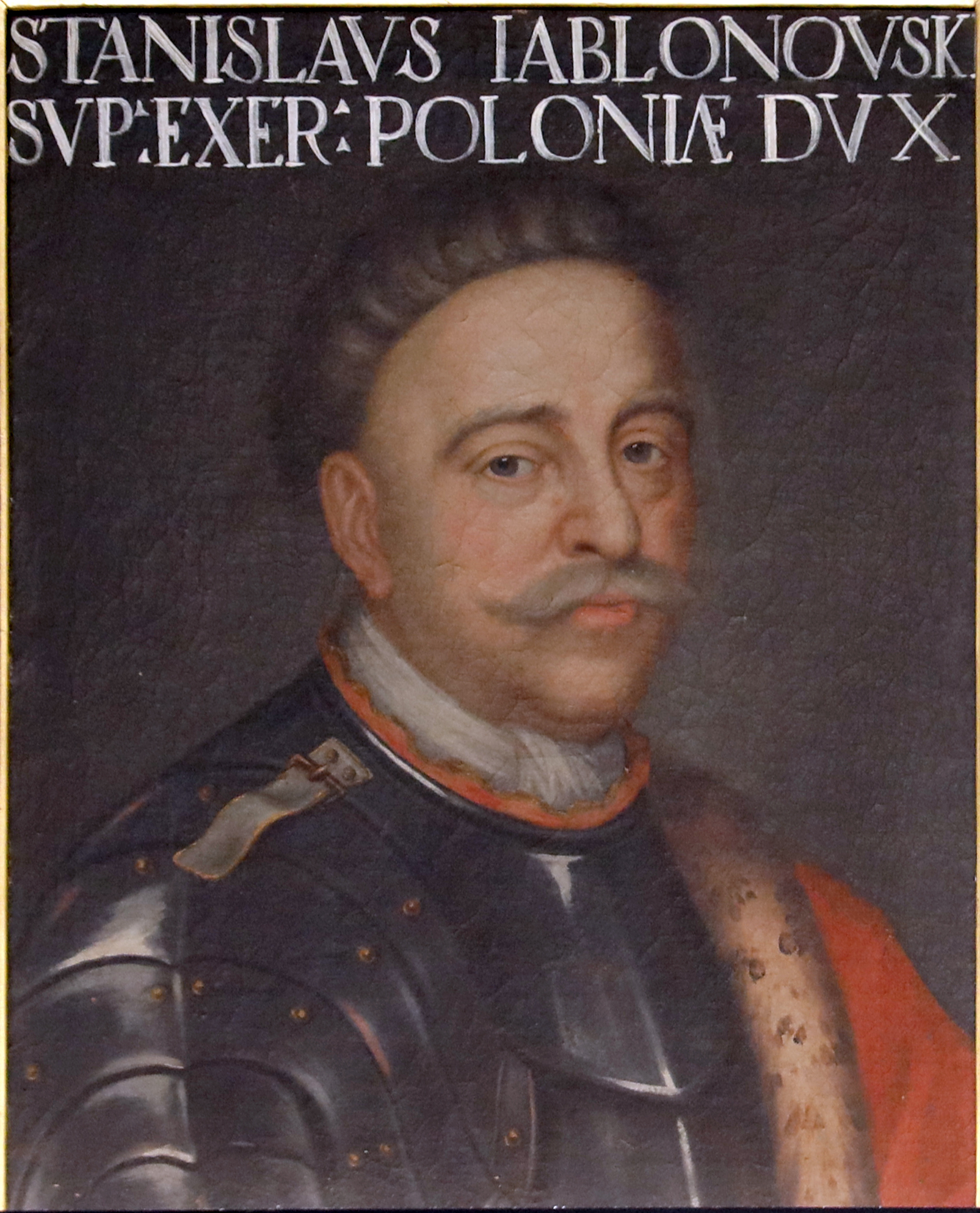
- Coat of arms: Prus III
- Born: 3 April 1634; Łucza, Kingdom of Poland
- Died: 3 April 1702 (aged 68); Lwów, Kingdom of Poland
- Noble family: Jabłonowski
- Spouse: Marianna Kazanowska
- Issue: Jan Stanisław Jabłonowski; Jadwiga Teresa Jabłonowska; Anna Jabłonowska; Aleksander Jan Jabłonowski; Stanisław Karol Jabłonowski; Joseph Jabłonowski
- Father: Jan Jabłonowski
- Mother: Anna Ostroróg

Prince Stanisław Jan Jabłonowski (1634–1702) was a Polish nobleman, magnate, Grand Guardian of the Crown since 1660, the Grand Camp Leader of the Crown since 1661, voivode of the Ruthenian Voivodship since 1664, Field Crown Hetman since 1676, Great Crown Hetman since 1683 and castellan of Kraków since 1692. Jabłonowski was a candidate for the Polish throne following the death of King John III Sobieski.

A talented and skillful political and military leader, Jabłonowski participated in the War with Sweden during The Deluge, then with the Cossacks and Muscovy. He took part in the Chocim campaign of 1673 and participated in the Vienna expedition of 1683. He led the right wing of Polish cavalry forces at the Battle of Vienna. He also stopped the Tatars at Lwów in 1695. In 1692 Jabłonowski built the stronghold and the neighbouring town of Okopy Świętej Trójcy. During the Royal election of 1697, he supported Augustus II, later in opposition to the King. In 1698, Emperor Leopold I granted him the title of Prince.

His daughter, Princess Anna Jabłonowska, who married Rafał Leszczyński, was the mother of King Stanisław I.

== Biography ==
Stanisław was son of the Lord Sword-Bearer Jan Jabłonowski (1600–1647) and Anna Ostroróg, the daughter of author and scholar Jan Ostroróg. After the abdication of King John II Casimir in 1668, Jabłonowski supported the French prince Louis, Grand Condé as a candidate for the Polish crown. He died on 3 April 1702.

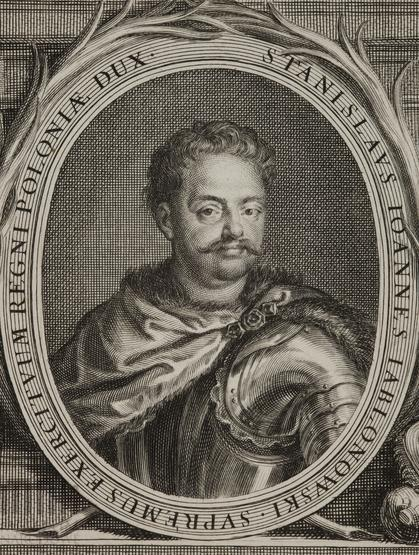
Engraving of S. Jabłonowski by Jean Mariette.

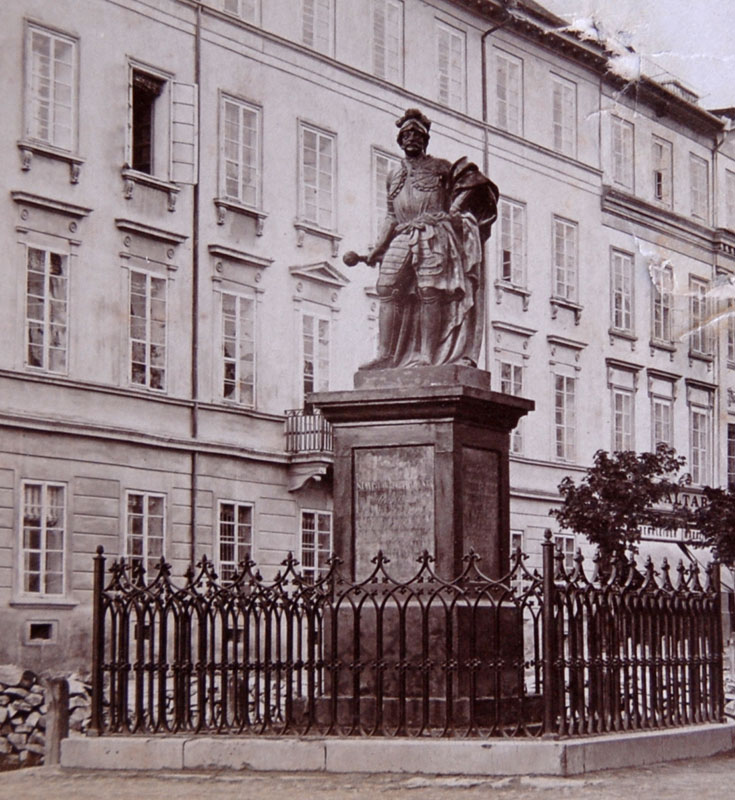
Monument to Hetman Jabłonowski in Lwów (now Lviv)

== Bibliography ==
- Mała Encyklopedia Wojskowa, 1967, Wydanie I
