= Anna Leszczyńska (1660–1727) =

Mother of Stanislaw Leszczynski, king of Poland

Anna Leszczyńska née Jabłonowska
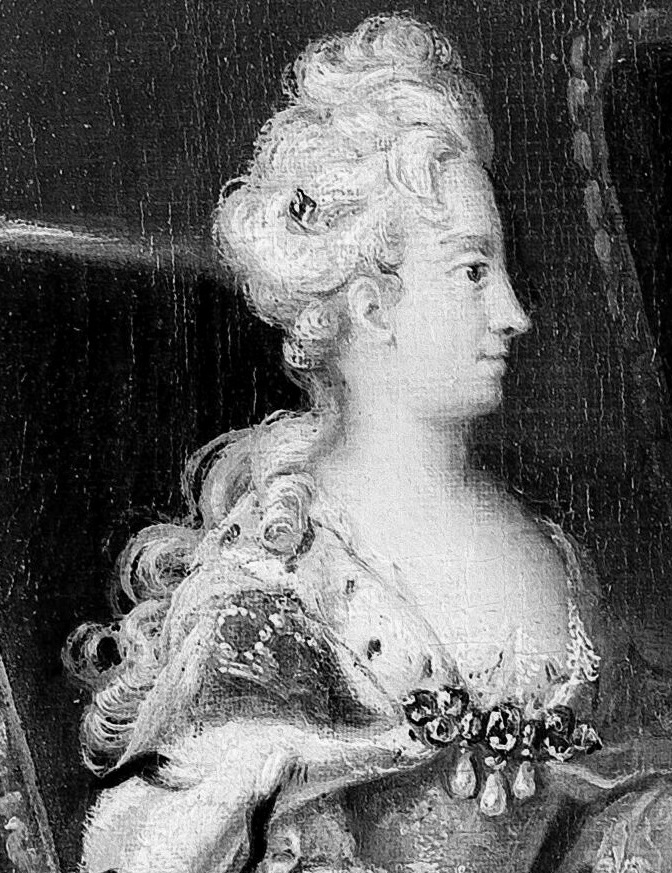
- Coat of arms: Prus III
- Born: 1660; Kraków, Poland
- Died: 29 August 1727 (aged 66–67); Chambord, Loir-et-Cher, France
- Noble family: Jabłonowski
- Spouse: Rafał Leszczyński (m. 1676; died 1703)
- Issue: Stanisław Leszczyński
- Father: Stanisław Jan Jabłonowski
- Mother: Marianna Kazanowska

Anna Leszczyńska (née Jabłonowska; 1660–1727) was a Polish noblewoman, born into the House of Jablonowski and the mother of King of Poland Stanislaus I Leszczyński.

== Life ==
Anna was the daughter of Hetman Prince Stanisław Jan Jabłonowski and Marianna Kazanowska. In 1676, she married the Grand Treasurer Rafał Leszczyński, son of Deputy Chancellor Bogusław Leszczyński.

Her son Stanisław Leszczyński became King of Poland with Swedish support in 1704 and reigned until 1709. During his first reign her brother Jan served as Crown Chancellor.

Anna Leszczyńska reportedly lived with her son and his family in his exile after the deposition of 1709, when he moved from Poland to Sweden, in 1714 to Zweibrücken in Germany, and finally, in 1718, to France.

Her relationship with Stanislaw was reportedly not happy at this point, as she felt disappointment over the loss of his royal position and exile and blamed this on the actions of Stanislaw, in which she was joined by her daughter-in-law Catherine Opalińska.

Through her son she was the grandmother of Maria Leszczyńska, who became queen of France by marriage to Louis XV in 1725, and therefore the great-great-grandmother of Louis XVI, Louis XVIII, and Charles X.

== Death ==
Anna Leszczyńska died during her exile, on 29 August 1727 in Chambord, Loir-et-Cher, France, aged circa 66-67.
