= Jan Stanisław Jabłonowski =

Polish political writer

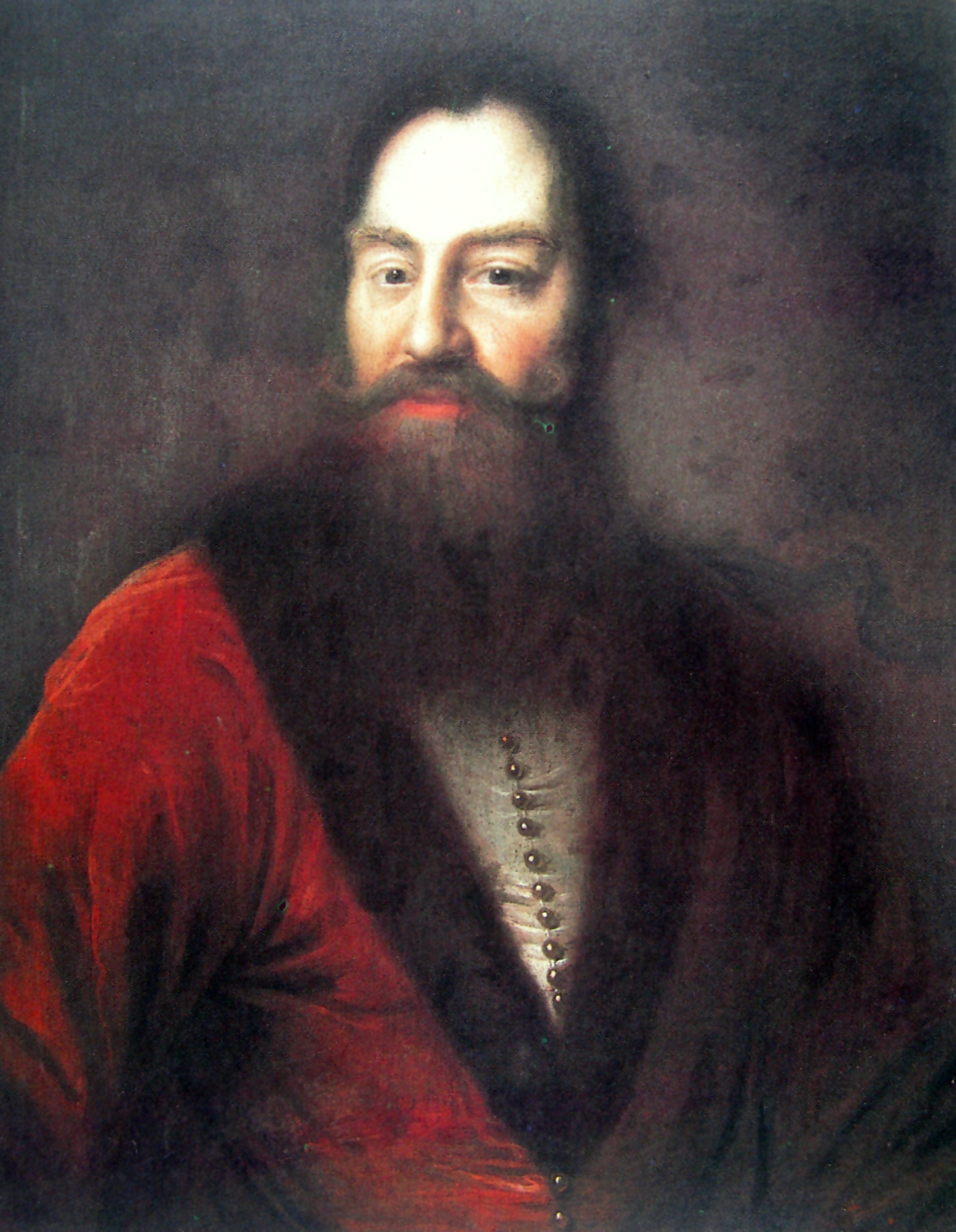
Jan S. Jabłonowski by Ádám Mányoki

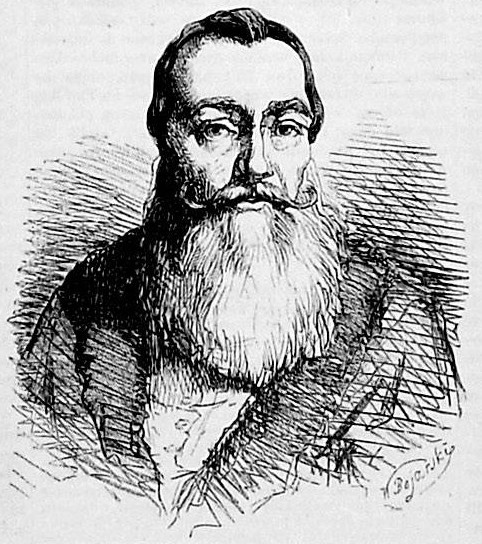
Jan S. Jabłonowski, drawn in 1863

Jan Stanisław Jabłonowski of the Prus III coat of arms (1669 - 28 April 1731 in Lviv) was a Polish political writer who was a maternal uncle of King Stanisław I Leszczyński, under whom he served as Crown Chancellor in 1706–09. He also held the positions of Crown standard-holder from 1687, voivode-governor of Volhynia since 1693, and also voivode-governor of Ruthenia from 1697.

He was the son of Marianna Kazanowska and Stanisław Jan Jabłonowski. Through them he was the brother of Aleksander, Stanisław, Jadwiga, and Anna. Through Anna, he was the uncle of King Stanisław Leszczyński and grand-uncle of Queen Maria Leszczyńska.

Despite this family relationship, in 1704, he took part in the Confederation of Sandomierz which supported Augustus II the Strong against his nephew. After Augustus was dethroned, he was suggested as a possible candidate, but never put himself forward; as part of the Northern Wars, Stanisław I Leszczyński was already supported by Karl XII. After this he went to Saxony, only switching his support to his nephew in 1706, after which he was appointed Chancellor. On his behalf, in 1713, he sought to dethrone Augustus, for which he was arrested on 7 August and released in 1717 by the Silent Sejm.

He was an avid art patron, responsible for bringing Augustyn Mirys to the country. He was also a recipient of the Order of the White Eagle and of the Spanish Order of the Golden Fleece.

He is portrayed in the novel Za Sasów of Józef Ignacy Kraszewski as a philosopher concerned for the fate of his country.
