= Ludwika Sosnowska =

Polish aristocrat (1751–1836)

- Princess
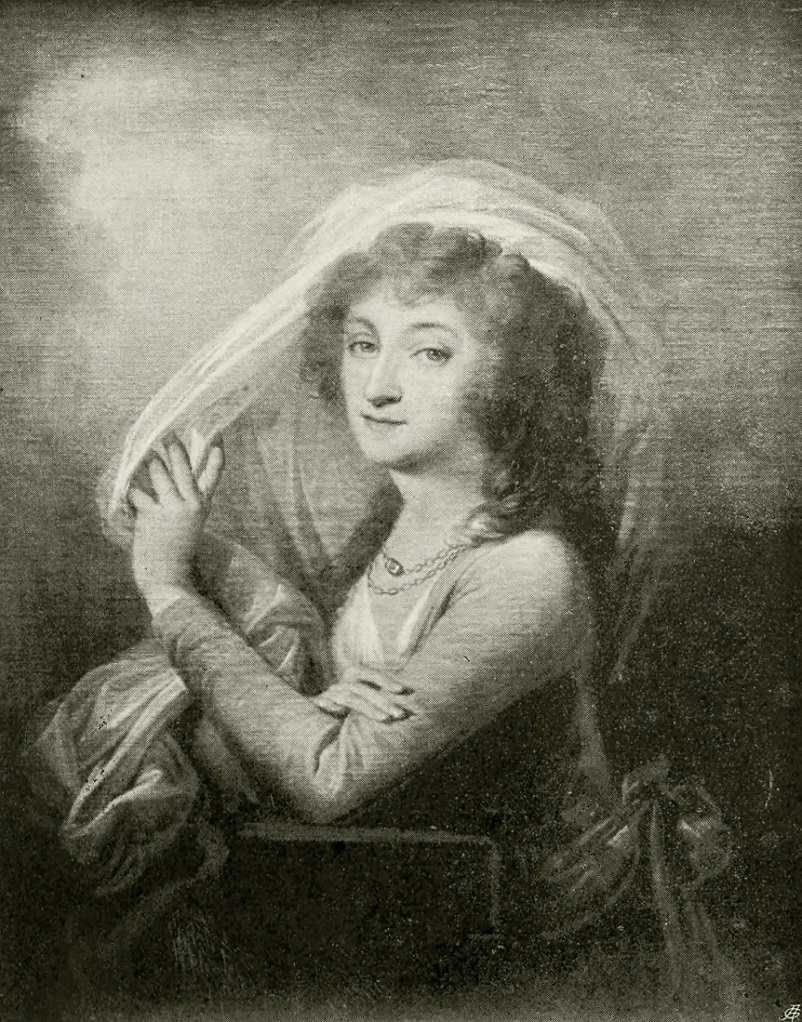
- Portrait by Joseph Grassi

- Coat of arms
- Born: 1751
- Died: 6 December 1836 (aged 84–85); Rivne
- Noble family: Nałęcz
- Husband: Józef Lubomirski
- Issue: Henryk Ludwik Lubomirski Fryderyk Wilhelm; Władysław Lubomirski; Karol Lubomirski Adelaida Lubomirska
- Father: Józef Sosnowski
- Mother: Tekla Despot-Zenowicz

Ludwika Sosnowska (1751 – 6 December 1836) was a Polish aristocrat, who co-translated the first physiocratic work from French to Polish, had an affair with the military engineer Tadeusz Kościuszko but ultimately married Prince Jozef Lubomirski.

== Biography ==
Born in 1751 Sosnowska was a Polish noblewoman, who was the daughter of Józef Sosnowski the Field Lithuanian Hetman and one of the richest men in Poland. As a young woman, Sosnowska had an affair with Tadeusz Kościuszko, who at the time was working as her tutor. She and Kościuszko tried to elope, but were thwarted by her father, who did not want her to marry Kościuszko. He was forced to leave Poland for France under the threat of death. Whilst she was Kościuszko's pupil Sosnowska and her sister made the first translation from French to Polish of a work on physiocracy.

After the affair, Sosnowska was confined to a convent. She then married Prince Jozef Lubomirski - a match organised by her father. In 1788 Sosnowska used her position as a Polish princess to petition the king for an appointment for Kościuszko in the Polish army. Due to financial problems, her husband in 1794 transferred her pledged property in Rivne, which she got out of debt. They had three children, Henryka Ludwika and Fryderyk Wilhelm and a daughter Helena. She died on 6 December 1836 in Rivne.

== Historiography ==
Much emphasis has been placed by biographers of Tadeusz Kościuszko on the role of this failed love affair in his life. Historian Halina Filipowicz suggested that the focus on this heterosexual affair by biographers could have been used as a device to hide homosexual inclinations.

== In literature ==
Sosnowska and her affair with Kościuszko feature in the play Lekcja polskiego (pl) by Anna Bojarska (pl). In her play she sends him a ring engraved with the words "To Virtue from Friendship".
