= Prus III coat of arms =

Polish coat of arms

Prus III
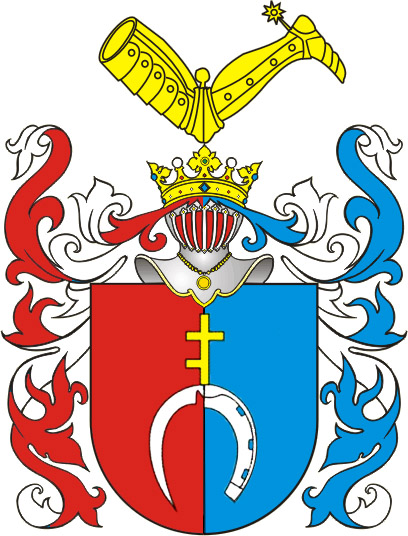
- Battle cry: Napora
- Alternative name: Nagody
- Earliest mention: 1415
- Towns: none
- Families: 120 names altogether: Andrzejewski, Augustowski, Bacewicz, Bełdycki, Bissiński, Bogdański, Broszowiecki, Brzeziński, Budzyna, Byszyński-Jakiel, Chładkowski, Chrzanowski, Czarnecki, Czarnowieński, Czarowieński, Czyrski, Dawidowski, Dłużniewski, Dobrzyńiecki, Glaznocki, Glaznowski, Głowacki, Gniewiński, Gościencki, Gościewicz, Groblewski, Grzybowski, Jabłonowski, Jarnułtowski, Jarontowski, Jaruntowski, Karmanowski, Karniński, Kodzioł, Kordzikowski, Korewicki, Korewicki, Korowicki, Kowalewski, Krakowieński, Kreczmer, Krzemieński, Krzemiński, Krzymiński, Kurewicki, Lankuna, Latyński, Łankuna, Łazarz, Łomski, Łomżski, Łomżyński, Łosowski, Łossowski, Magdaleński, Manowski, Miński, Mlącki, Mlądzki, Młądzki, Młyński, Morozowicz, Mroczkowski, Mroziński, Mrozowicki, Mrozowiecki, Mrozowski, Nagolski, Napierkowski, Napiorkowski, Napiórkowski, Ogrodzieński, Ogrodziński, Opacki, Petrulewicz, Piottuch, Piotuch, Pisanka, Pisanko, Plewiński, Podleski, Podlewski, Prossewski, Proszewski, Prószewski, Prusiecki, Pruski, Pruskowski, Prusakowski, Pruszkówski, Przechadzki, Przechalski, Puzewski, Pysznicki, Radomski, Radulski, Rossochacki, Rozenbark, Rudalski, Rudkowski, Rudzieński, Rudziński, Rzeczkowski, Sobor, Strękowski, Stucki, Studziński, Tomikowski, Tymiński, Uciąski, Wiczfiński, Wietwiński, Witwiński, Wotowski, Wrotnowski, Wyczfiński, Załęski, Zdrodowski, Zdroikowski, Zglinicki, Zieliński, Zuchorski, Żochowski, Żuchorski, Żukowski

Herb Prus III is a Polish coat of arms. It was used by several szlachta families in the times of the Polish–Lithuanian Commonwealth.

The son of Prince of Prussia (which the Christian faith has passed, and married an only child, a daughter Maslausa, his coat of arms of Prussia, two deadly scythe given them) while his married the heiress of a great fortune coat of arms Pobóg (for God) - (Kasper Niesiecki binds Pobóg arms with the arms Zagłoba directly and indirectly with hawkweed), his coat of arms Prus II, as and father did, half a horseshoe in handy. Then, when a descendant of the Sobor, valiantly in the war lost the starting leg, King Boleslaw sent him a reward and on the helmet, not the hand but the golden leg armed, to commemorate the bravery of his, wear allowed. This herb is also called Nagody, it means that for God or weddings, a variety of coat of arms was created.

Shield in pole split in the right red - wolf silver knife blade down toward the center rotated in the left blue - half of silver horseshoe nailed to a one and a half gold cross, the lower arm to the right, the jewel foot armed with a spur, in knee bent, foot to the left.

== Notable bearers ==
Notable bearers of this coat of arms include:

- Stanisław Jan Jabłonowski
- Antoni Barnaba Jabłonowski
- Anna Jabłonowska
- Krzemiński

== See also ==
- Prus coat of arms
- Prus II Wilczekosy coat of arms
- List of Polish nobility coats of arms images
- Polish heraldry
- Heraldry
