= Antoni Barnaba Jabłonowski =

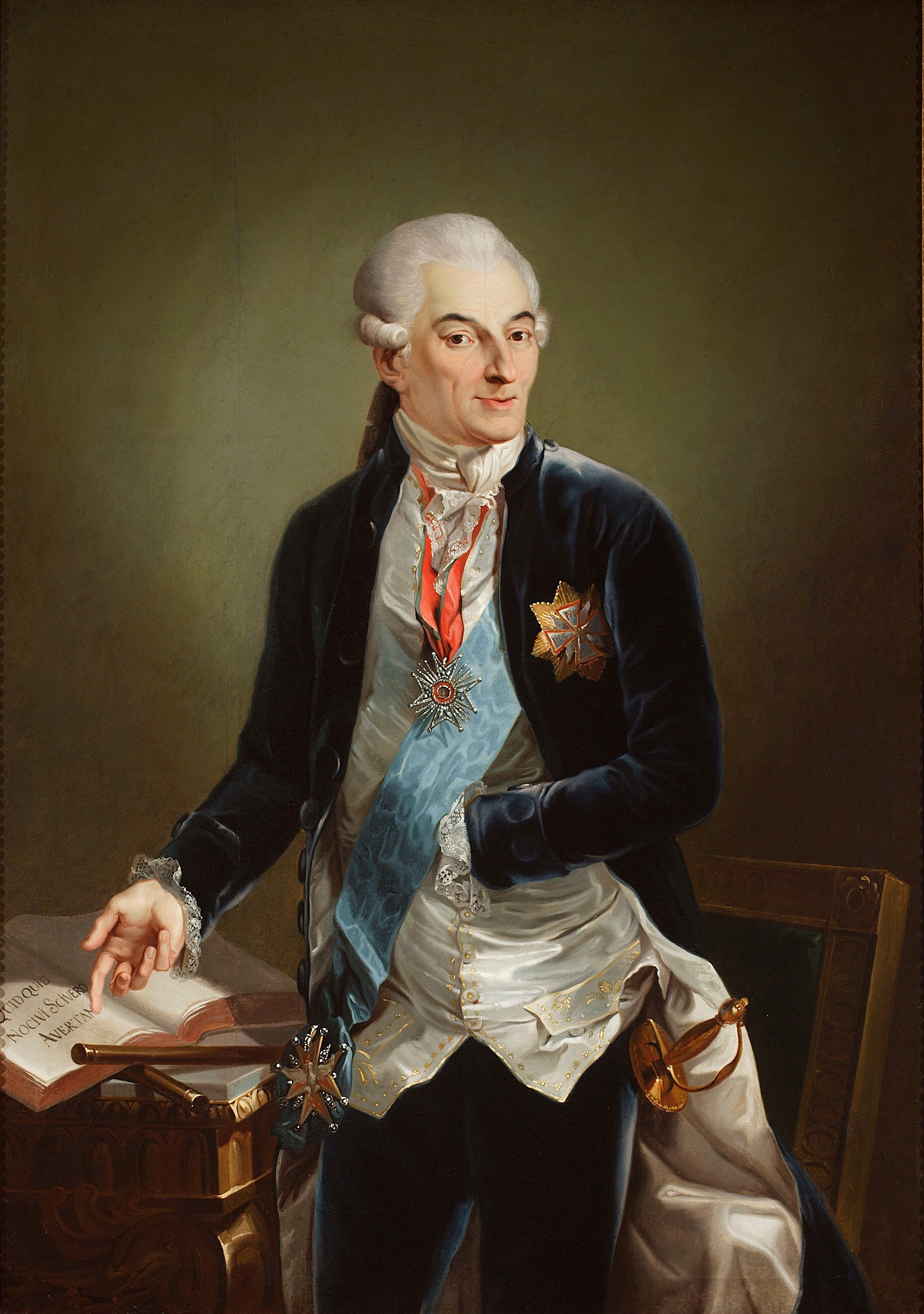
- Portrait by Józef Peszka
- Coat of arms: Prus III
- Born: 27 January 1732; Warsaw, Poland
- Died: 4 April 1799 (aged 67); Warsaw, Poland
- Noble family: Jabłonowski
- Spouses: Anna Sanguszko; Tekla Czaplic h. Kierdeja
- Issue: with Anna Sanguszko; Stanisław Pawel Jabłonowski; Dorota Barbara Jabłonowska with Tekla Czaplic; Maksymilian Jabłonowski; Teresa Jabłonowska
- Father: Stanisław Wincenty Jabłonowski
- Mother: Dorota Bronisz h. Wieniawa

Antoni Barnaba Jabłonowski (1732–1799) was a Polish noble (szlachcic) and political activist.

Antoni became voivode of Poznań Voivodship in 1760, castellan of Kraków since 1782, starost of Międzyrzecz, Busko-Zdrój, Świecie and Czehryń.

During the Confederation of Bar he was envoy of the leaders of the confederation to the royal court in Austria. He participated in the Great Sejm in 1788–1792 and was member of the Patriotic Party. He was a supporter of the 3 May Constitution. In 1794 he participated in the Kościuszko Uprising.

Knight of the Order of the White Eagle, awarded on 3 August 1761, in Warsaw.

== Bibliography ==
- Helena Wereszycka, Jabłonowski Antoni Barnaba, [w:] Polski Słownik Biograficzny, tom 10, Wrocław – Warszawa 1962–1964, str. 216–218.
- Andrzej Betlej, Sibi, Deo, posteritati. Jabłonowscy a sztuka w XVIII wieku, Kraków 2010, ISBN 978-83-61033-38-7, str. 326–327.
