= Eustachy Erazm Sanguszko =

Polish nobleman and general (1768–1844)

- Prince
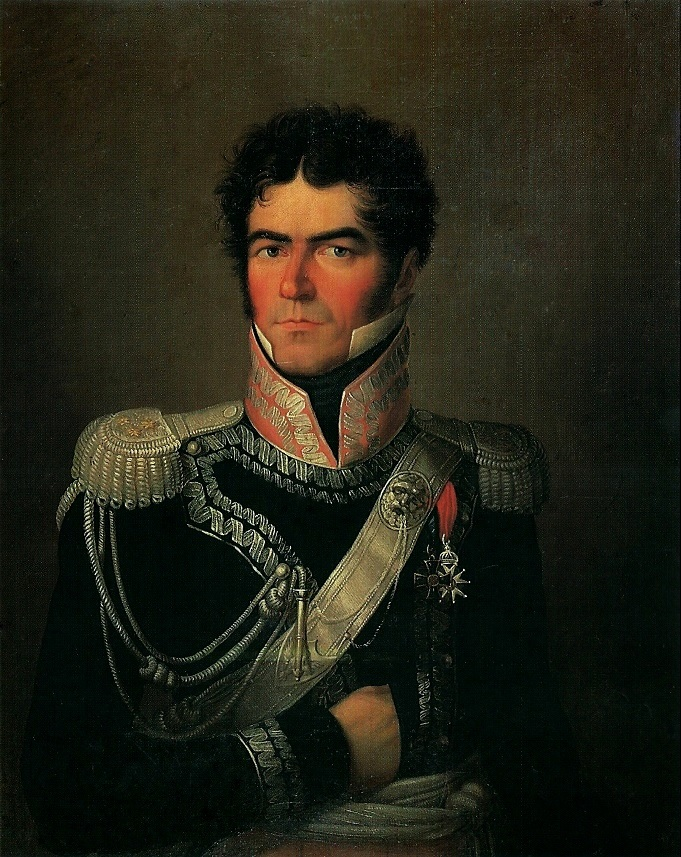
- Coat of arms: Pogoń Litewska coat of arms
- Born: 26 October 1768; Radzyń Podlaski
- Died: 2 December 1844 (aged 76); Slavuta
- Family: Sanguszko
- Consort: Klementyna Czartoryska
- Issue: Dorota Sanguszko; Roman Sanguszko; Władysław Hieronim Sanguszko
- Father: Hieronim Janusz Sanguszko
- Mother: Cecylia Urszula Potocka

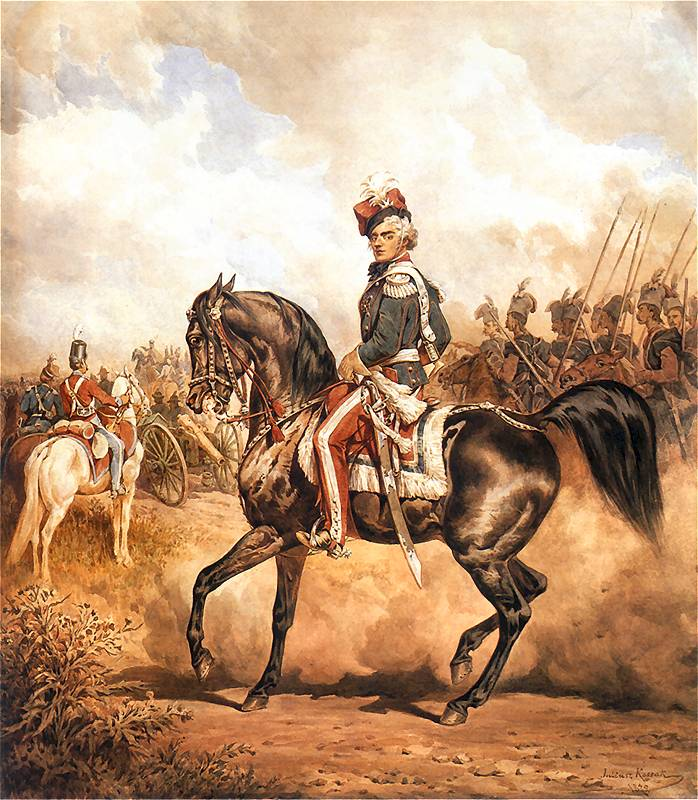
Eustachy Erazm Sanguszko in the Uniform of National Cavalry by Juliusz Kossak

Prince Eustachy Erazm Sanguszko (1768–1844) was a Polish nobleman, general, military commander, diplomat and politician.

== Early life ==
Eustachy Erazm Sanguszko was born in 1768 to Hieronim Janusz Sanguszko and Cecylia Usrzula Potocka.

== French Royal army ==
In the years 1780–1786, Sanguszko graduated from the military school of Strasbourg and served in the Régiment Royal-Allemand (together with Stanisław Mokronowski) of the French Royal army.

== Polish-Lithuanian Commonwealth ==
=== Four-Year Sejm ===
On 3 February 1789, Sanguszko began service in the Crown Army as a captain in the 8th National Cavalry Brigade. On 5 October 1789, he was promoted to major, and on 28 April 1792, to vice-brigadier. He was a representative of the Lublin Voivodeship in the Great Sejm of 1788–1792. Sanguszko partook in the War of the Second Partition where he fought at the Battle of Zieleńce as a cavalry brigadier, receiving the Virtuti Militari in its wake on 23 June. On 29 July 1792, the 24-year-old Sanguszko was promoted to brigadier, having taken over the command of the whole brigade on 25 June. As the Targowica Confederation had won, he joined the Imperial Russian Army to save his goods and possessions from confiscation.

=== Kościuszko Uprising ===
During the Kościuszko Uprising in 1794 he was a major general and a divisional commander. At the Battle of Szczekociny he saved Kościuszko's life. Then during the siege of Warsaw he was wounded.

== Napoleonic Wars ==
He was a member of the general staff of Napoleon Bonaparte during the Russian campaign (with the rank of brigadier general) and took part in the march on Moscow. In the Duchy of Warsaw he was the vice-Regimentarz of the pospolite ruszenie (general call-up).

To protect family land holdings in Ukraine, Sanguszko refused to participate in Prince Poniatowski's 1813 campaign, for which the commander-in-chief, an old friend, punished him harshly with a dishonourable discharge from the army.

== Congress of Poland ==
After the fall of Napoleon, Sanguszko settled on his ancestral lands that included the battlefield of Zieleńce. There he often pondered on past historic events in which he took part and described his thoughts in his "Memoirs". Between 1817–1820 he was the governor marshal of Volhynia.

== Personal life ==
=== Family ===
On 26 June 1798, in Slavuta, he married Klementyna Czartoryska with whom he had three children: Dorota (1799-1831), Roman (1800-81), and Władysław (1803–70). Earlier on he had been romantically involved with Julia Lubomirska.

== Honours ==
He was decorated with the Knight's Cross of the Polish Virtuti Militari and Chevalier of the French Legion of Honour.

== See also ==
- Sanguszko family
