= Józef Klemens Czartoryski =

Polish noble (1740–1810)

- Prince
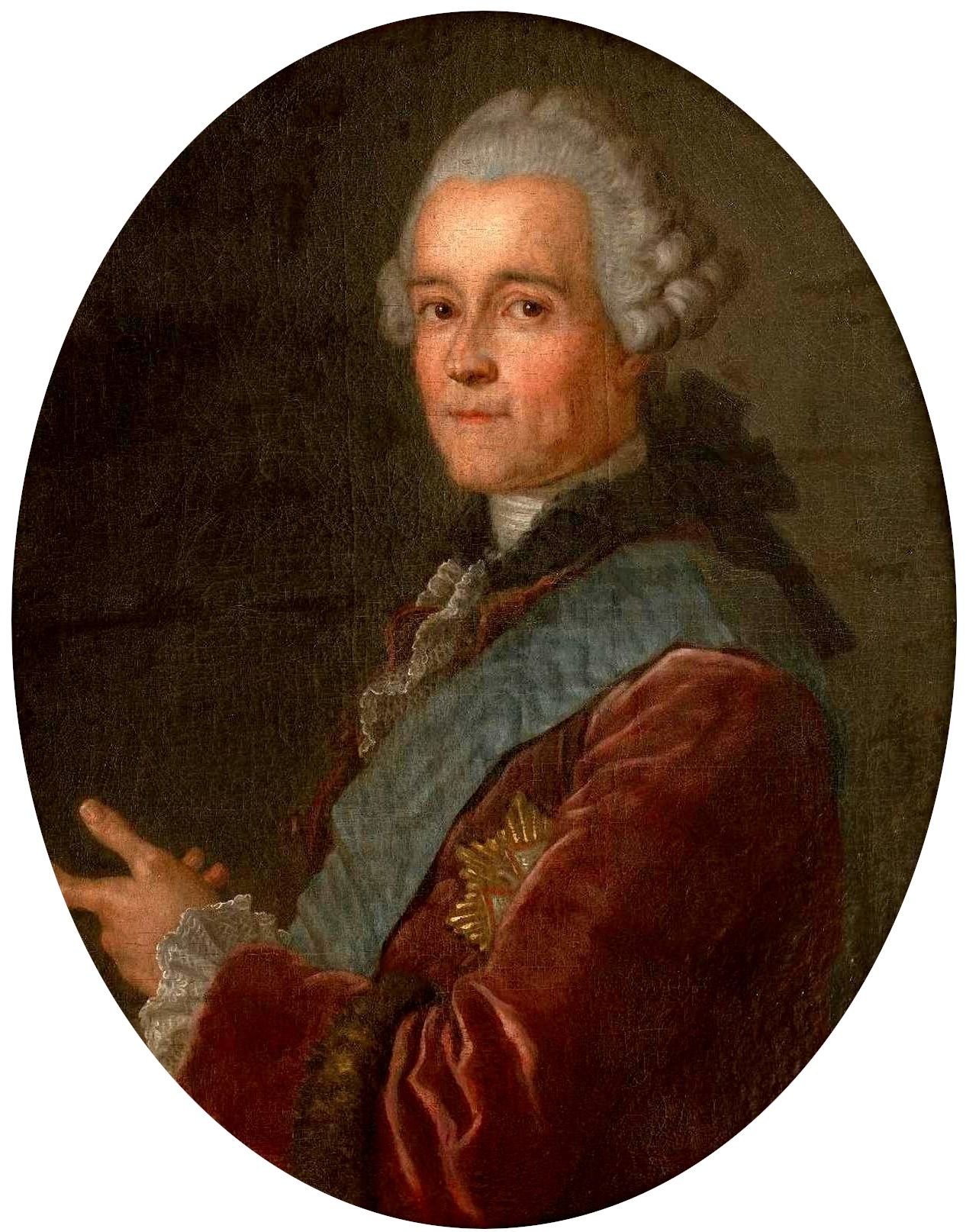
- Portrait by Charles-Amédée-Philippe van Loo
- Coat of arms: Czartoryski
- Born: 21 November 1740; Brin
- Died: 15 February 1810 (aged 69); Warsaw
- Family: Czartoryski
- Consort: Dorota Barbara Jabłonowska
- Issue: Maria Antonina Czartoryska; Klementyna Czartoryska; Teresa Czartoryska; Józefina Maria Czartoryska; Celestyna Czartoryska
- Father: Stanisław Kostka Czartoryski
- Mother: Anna Rybińska

Prince Józef Klemens Czartoryski (1740–1810) was a Polish nobleman (szlachcic) who owned Korets Castle. He was a Knight of the Order of the White Eagle, awarded in 1767.

== Early life ==
Prince Czartoryski was born in Brin on 21 November 1740. He was a son of Prince Stanisław Kostka Czartoryski (a son of Prince Józef Czartoryski and Countess Teresa von Dönhoff) and Anna Rybińska (a daughter of Jakub Zygmunt Rybiński).

== Career ==
He became the Grand Stalininkas of Lithuania in 1764, Klucznik (Steward) of Volhynia in 1772 and Starost and Wójt of Łuki and Radoszyce.

He produced faience and porcelain at his estate, until the manufactory burnt down. After 1797, he was engaged in making Kontusz sashes (Pas kontuszowy), for the nobility.

From 1789 to 1790 he was the Polish envoy in Berlin and was heavily involved in forging the Polish–Prussian alliance.

== Personal life ==
In 1778, Czartoryski was married to Dorota Barbara Jabłonowska (1760–1844). Together, they were the parents of five daughters:

- Maria Antonina Czartoryska (c. 1778–1856), who married Jan Alojzy Potocki in 1796.
- Klementyna Czartoryska (1780–1852), who married Prince Eustachy Erazm Sanguszko in 1798.
- Teresa Czartoryska (1785–1868), who married Prince Henryk Ludwik Lubomirski in 1807.
- Józefina Maria Czartoryska (1787–1862), who married Count Alfred Wojciech Potocki in 1814.
- Celestyna Czartoryska (1790–1850), who married Gabriel Stanisław Rzyszczewski in 1812.

Czartoryski died on 15 February 1810.

Coat of Arms

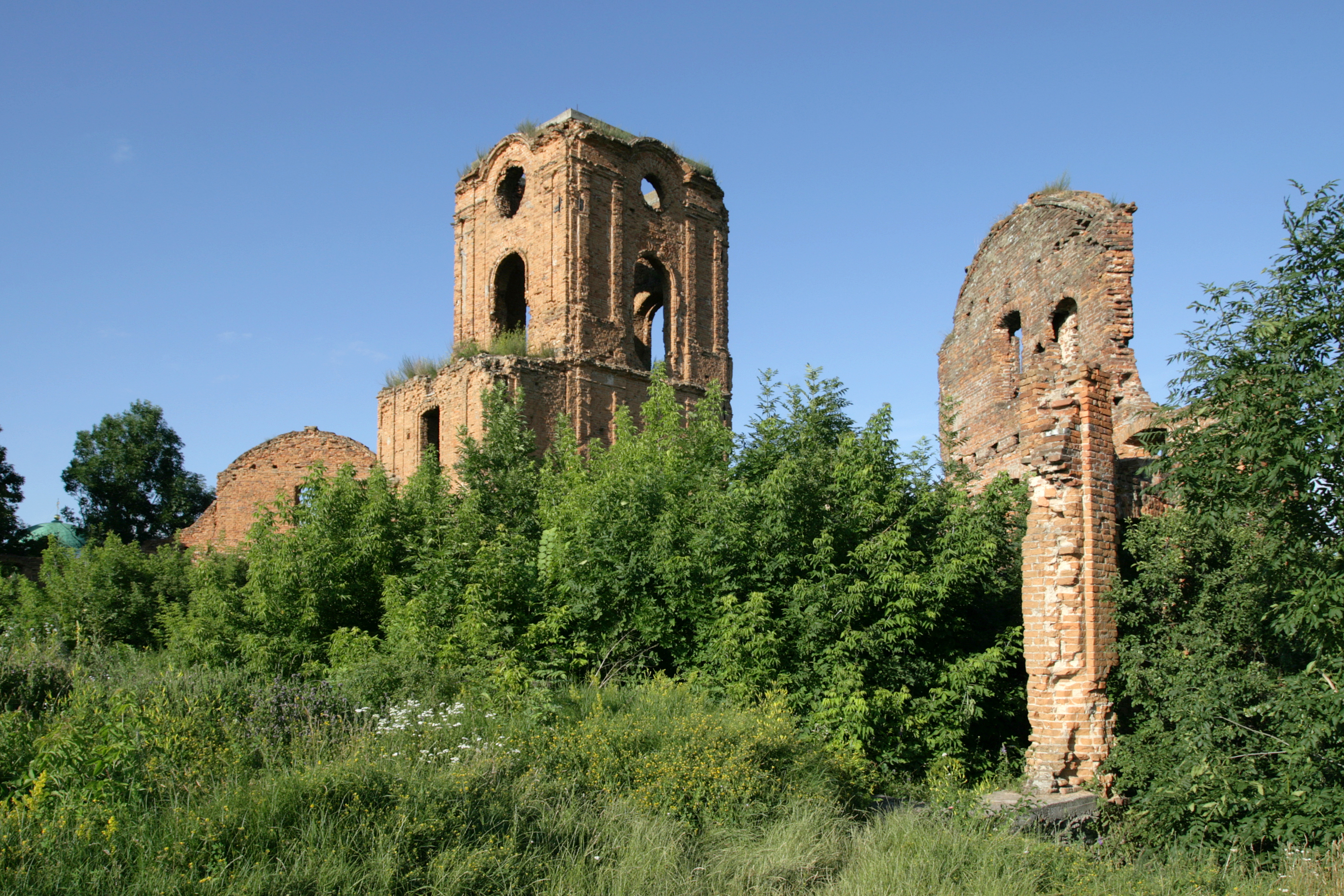
The ruins of Korets Castle
