= Prince Louis of Liechtenstein =

Liechtenstein prince and Austrian politician (1846–1920)

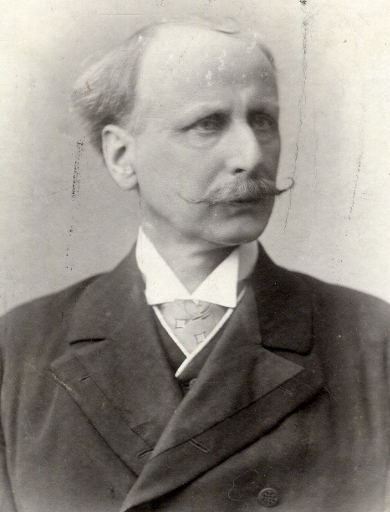
- Born: 18 November 1846; Prague
- Died: 25 March 1920 (aged 73); Vienna
- Spouse: Marie Fox (m. 1872; died 1878) Johanna Elisabeth Maria von Klinkosch (m. 1890)
- Issue: Princess Sophie, Mrs. Ürményi d'Ürmény; Princess Julie; Princess Henriette; Princess Marie, Countess of Meran, Baroness of Brandhofen
Names
- Aloys Franz de Paula Maria von Liechtenstein
- House: Liechtenstein
- Father: Prince Franz de Paula of Liechtenstein
- Mother: Countess Ewa Józefina Julia Potocka

Wedding of Prince Louis and Marie Fox, 1872

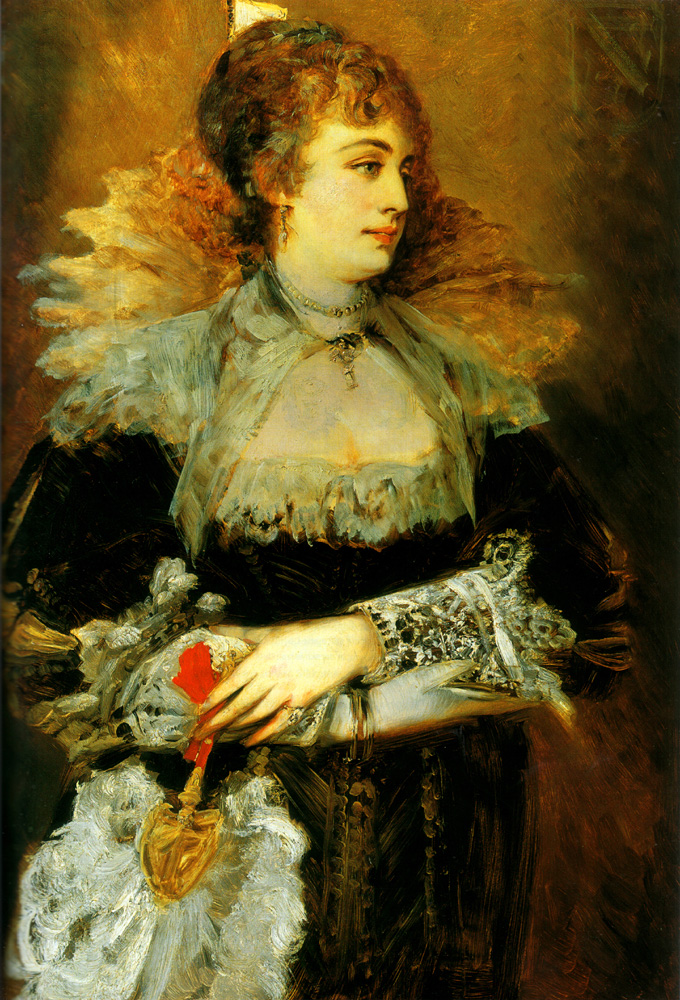
Prince's second wife: Johanna Elisabeth Maria von Klinkosch, by Hans Makart, 1875

Prince Aloys Franz de Paula Maria of Liechtenstein (18 November 1846 – 25 March 1920), known in English as Prince Louis, was an Austrian politician and member of the House of Liechtenstein. He was a deputy in the Austrian Imperial Council from 1878 to 1889 and 1891 to 1911. From 1910 to 1918 he chaired the Christian Social Party. In 1912 he was appointed to the House of Lords. His commitment to social reforms in the spirit of the "Workers' Pope" Leo XIII and his social encyclical Rerum novarum earned him the nickname "Red Prince" (der rote Prinz).

== Early life ==
He was born as the son of Prince Franz de Paula of Liechtenstein (1802–1887) and his wife, Countess Julia Potocka. Louis was younger brother of Prince Alfred of Liechtenstein and first cousin of Johann II, Prince of Liechtenstein.

== Life and career ==
As did most of his family, Aloys attended the Schottengymnasium in Vienna. After studying law at the University of Vienna from 1864 to 1868, he joined the Austrian army's hussar regiment as a lieutenant. He changed to the diplomatic service in 1869, serving as an attaché in Munich, London and Berlin. He resigned the diplomatic service in 1873 and was transferred to the military reserves the following year, holding the rank of first lieutenant.

An opponent of liberalism that dominated the politics of Cisleithania after the 1867 December Constitution, Prince Aloys joined the conservative Catholic People's Association in 1874. He served in the House of Deputies (lower house) of the Reichsrat from 1878 to 1889 as a Catholic-Conservative member of parliament. In 1881 he became a member, and from 1888–1889 was chairman of the conservative Zentrum-Klub.

In 1875, he met Karl von Vogelsang and in 1887 came into contact with Karl Lueger, joining the latter's Christian Social Party (Christlichsozialen Partei) when it was founded in 1891. Aloys, Lueger, Vogelsang and Franz Martin Schindler met regularly at the Hotel Zur goldenen Ente (Golden Duck, Riemergasse 4) in Vienna's First District, and would refer to their meetings as Enten-Abende (Duck Evenings). This working group became the focus for social reform and they organised the Second Austrian Katholikentag in 1889. From this Schindler developed the platform of the fledgling Christian Social Party.

He represented the party in parliament until 1911. He worked to bring the Catholic Conservatives and Christian Socials into a coalition between 1896–1907 to keep the liberals in opposition. After Lueger's death in 1910, he became chair of the party.

From 1896 to 1918 he was a member of the Landtag of Lower Austria, serving as its president (Landmarschall) since 1906. In 1912 he was appointed to the House of Lords (Herrenhaus) but progressively withdrew from public life due to ill health since 1916.

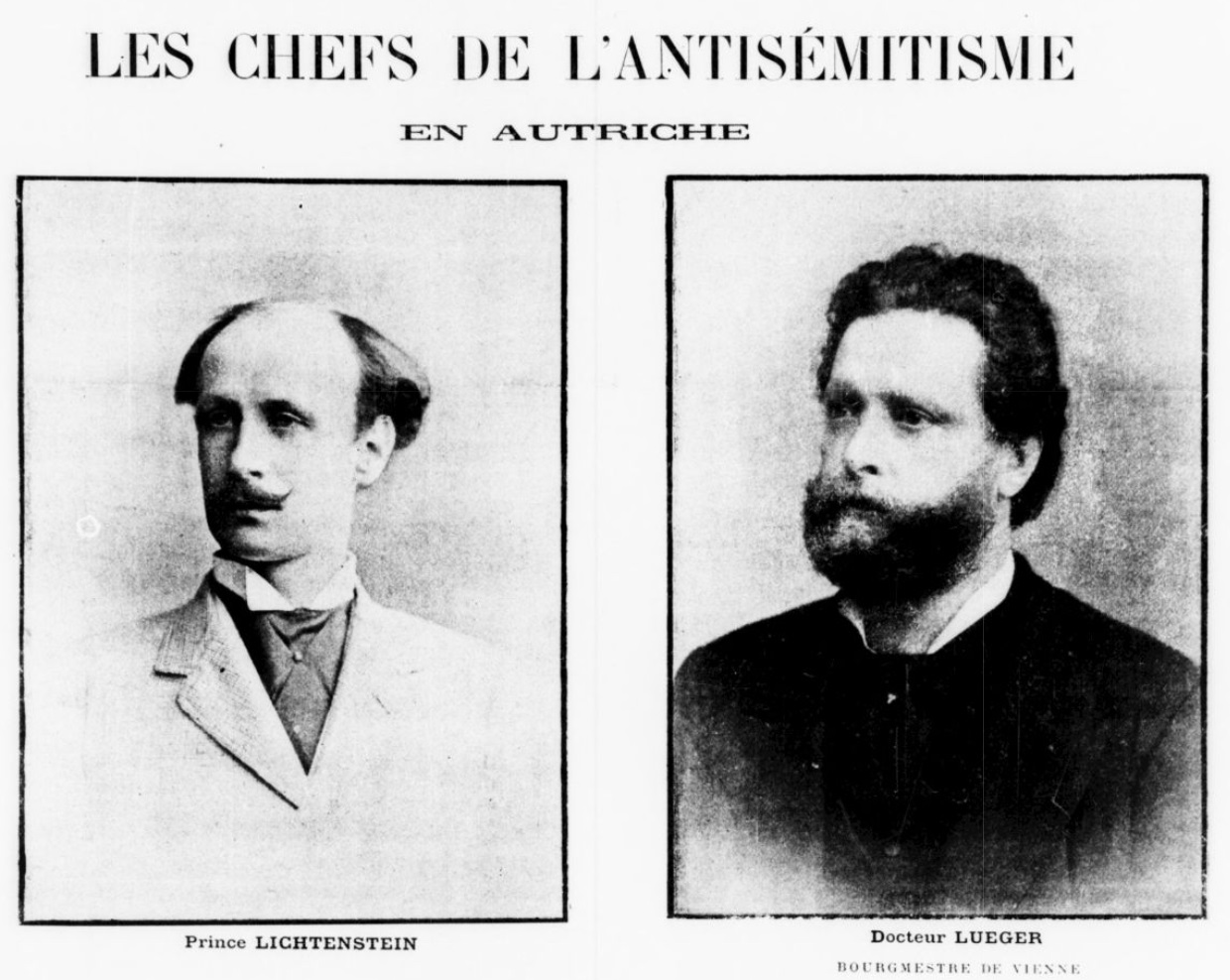
The leaders of Austrian antisemitism: Prince Liechtenstein and Karl Lueger (L'Antijuif, 1899)

He resigned all offices with the collapse of Austria-Hungary and the abolition of monarchy in 1918. His campaigns for social reform, religious schools (Konfessionsschulen) and religious law were in the spirit of Pope Leo XIII.

Like Lueger, he was considered an Antisemite.

He is buried in a dedicated grave in Vienna's central cemetery, the Zentralfriedhof (32A, 54).

== First marriage and issue ==
He married firstly in London on 27 June 1872 Marie Fox, adopted daughter of Henry Edward Fox, 4th Baron Holland and wife Lady Mary Augusta Coventry, and had issue, four daughters. Marie died in 1878, aged 28. (Note: Description of the ceremony appeared in The Manchester Examiner & Times on 28 June 1872, reprinted in the New York Times on July 12) She was buried in the Kirchhof, Hollenegg, Austria.

His family, the House of Liechtenstein, initially refused to approve the union on the grounds of inequality of birth, but later treated the marriage as equal, while the princess was largely accepted in Vienna.

Together, they had four daughters.

Their children were:

- Princess Sophie Maria Josepha (Berlin, 29 March 1873 – Graz, 2 March 1947); married Franz Ürményi d'Ürmény (14 January 1863 - 20 February 1934), without issue.
- Princess Julie Margarethe Maria (Schloss Burgstall, 20 July 1874 – Mayerling, 3 July 1950); unmarried and without issue
- Princess Henriette Maria Josefa (Schloss Burgstall, 6 July 1875 – Pertlstein, 21 April 1958), a Benedictine nun under the name Sister Adelgundis
- Princess Marie Johanna Franziska Sophie (Schloss Burgstall, 21 August 1877 – Vienna, 11 January 1939); married in Vienna on 7 June 1902 Count Franz Peter Johann of Meran-Brandhofen (Graz, 5 October 1868 – Bad Aussee, 10 November 1949), son of Franz, Count of Meran (1839–1891) and his wife, Countess Theresia von Lamberg (1836–1913). The couple had six children.

== Second marriage ==
Louis married secondly in Vienna on 20 May 1890 Johanna Elisabeth Maria von Klinkosch (Vienna, 13 August 1849 – Baden bei Wien, 31 January 1925), the daughter of the master silversmith Josef Carl Ritter von Klinkosch (1822–1888) and his wife, Elisabeth Johanna Caroline Swoboda (1830–1910), without issue.

She is buried in Helenenfriedhof, Baden bei Wien, Austria.

== Ancestry ==
Ancestors of Prince Louis of Liechtenstein

16. Prince Emanuel of Liechtenstein
8. Franz Joseph I, Prince of Liechtenstein
17. Countess Maria Antonia of Dietrichstein
4. Johann I Joseph, Prince of Liechtenstein
18. František Filip, Count of Sternberg
9. Countess Leopoldine of Sternberg
19. Countess Maria Leopoldina of Starhemberg
2. Prince Franz de Paula of Liechtenstein
20. Ludwig August Egon, Landgrave of Fürstenberg-Weitra
10. Joachim Egon, Landgrave of Fürstenberg-Weitra
21. Countess Maria Anna Fugger of Kirchberg and Weissenhorn
5. Landgravine Josepha of Fürstenberg-Weitra
22. Philipp Karl, Count of Oettingen-Wallerstein
11. Countess Sophia of Oettingen-Wallerstein
23. Countess Charlotte Juliana of Oettingen-Baldern
1. Prince Aloys Franz de Paula Maria
24. Count Józef Potocki
12. Count Jan Nepomucen Potocki
25. Princess Anna Teresa Ossolińska
6. Count Alfred Wojciech Potocki
26. Prince Stanisław Lubomirski
13. Princess Julia Lubomirska
27. Princess Elżbieta Izabela Czartoryska
3. Countess Julia Potocka
28. Prince Stanisław Kostka Czartoryski
14. Prince Józef Klemens Czartoryski
29. Anna Józefa Rybińska
7. Princess Józefina Czartoryska
30. Prince Antoni Barnaba Jablonowski
15. Princess Dorota Barbara Jablonowska
31. Princess Anna Sanguszko-Lubartowicz

== Works ==
- Über Interessenvertretung im Staat, 1877 (Advocacy and the State)
- Die soziale Frage, 1877 (The Social Question)
- Österreich-Ungarns äußere Politik, 1916 (Austria-Hungary's Foreign Policy)
- Österreichs neue politische Organisation, 1916 (Austria's New Political Organisation)
- Numerous journal articles, particularly Das Neue Reich (1918–1920)

== Bibliography ==
- M. Banauch, Prinz A. von und zu Liechtenstein. Stationen im Leben eines ungewöhnlichen Politikers, Diplomarbeit, Wien 1997
- Neue Österreichische Biographie
- Österreichisches Biographisches Lexikon
- Neue Deutsche Biographie

== See also ==
- List of political parties in Austria
