= Alfred Potocki (1786–1862) =

Polish nobleman and landowner (1785–1862)

Alfred Wojciech Potocki
- Coat of arms: Pilawa
- Born: 3 March 1785; Paris, Kingdom of France
- Died: 23 December 1862 (aged 77); Łańcut, Kingdom of Galicia and Lodomeria, Austrian Empire
- Family: Potocki
- Wife: Princess Józefina Maria Czartoryska
- Issue: Alfred Józef Potocki; Ewa Józefina Julia Potocka; Zofia Ewa Potocka
- Father: Count Jan Potocki
- Mother: Princess Julia Lubomirska

Count Alfred Wojciech Potocki hr. Piława (1785–1862) was a Polish nobleman (szlachcic), landowner, political and economic activist.

Alfred was the 1st Ordynat of Łańcut estates. From 1809 until 1815 he served in the army of the Duchy of Warsaw. In 1812 he became aide-de-camp of Prince Józef Antoni Poniatowski and participated in Napoleon's campaign against Russia.

In 1838 he created the Łańcut Ordynacja. Since 1861 Alfred was member of the National Sejm in Galicia, and member of the Herrenhaus. He served as the Austrian councillor and was the Galician Great Ochmistrz.

Alfred helped to modernize the agriculture in Galicia. He founded textile (1839–1844) and sugar (1836–1841) factories. He was co-founder of the "Estate Credit Society" in Lwów. Since 1823 he ran the Lubomirski family distillery in Łańcut, which exists today under the name Polmos Łańcut.

His father was the writer Jan Potocki, best known for his famous novel The Manuscript Found in Saragossa. His brother was Count Artur Potocki (1787–1832), who married Countess Zofia Branicka.

== Marriage and issue ==
Alfred Wojciech married Princess Józefina Maria Czartoryska on 21 June 1814 and had four children:

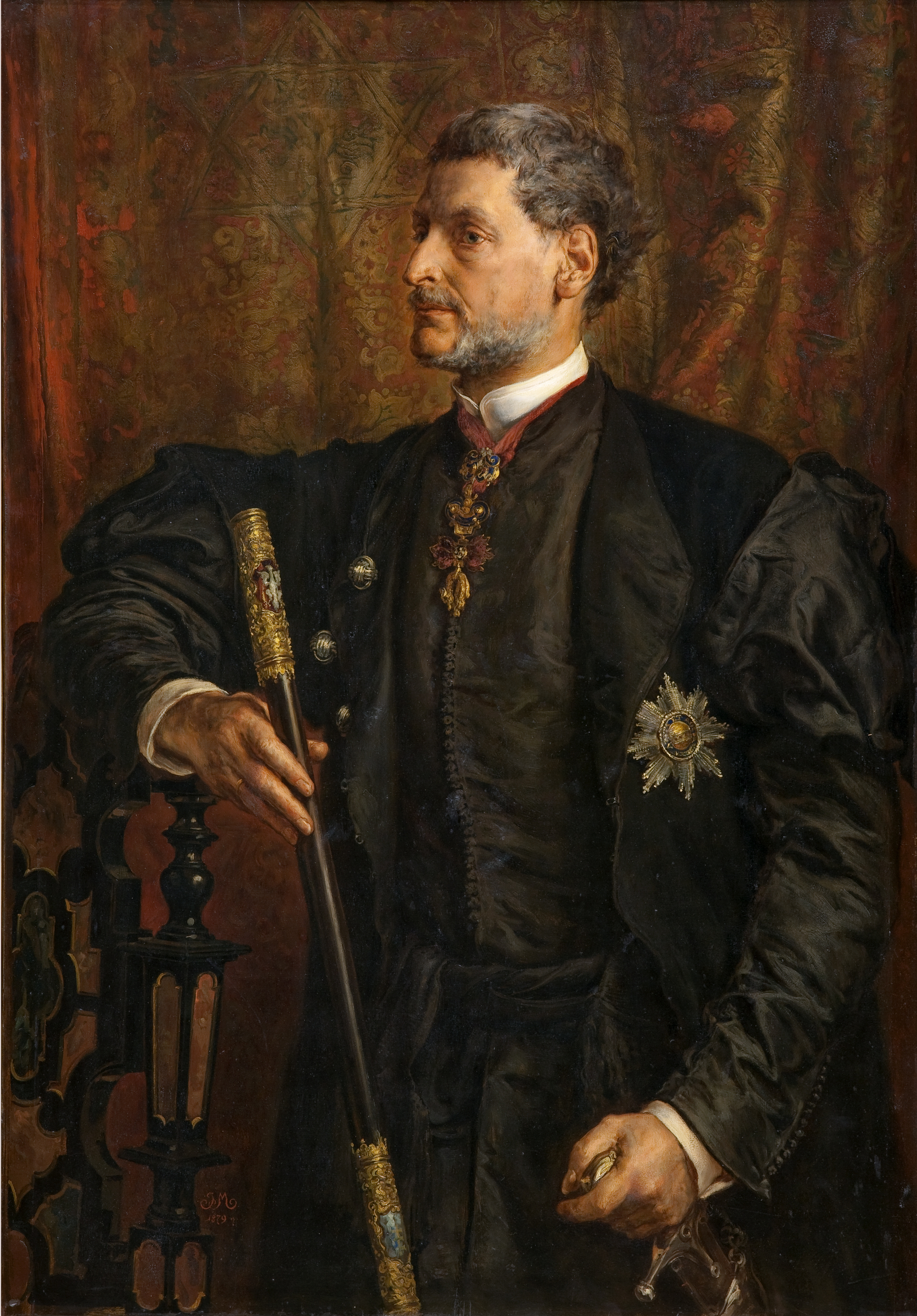
- Portrait of his son, Alfred Potocki (1879) by Jan Matejko
  Count Alfred Józef Potocki (1817 or 1822–1889), married Princess Maria Klementyna Sanguszko
- Countess Ewa Józefina Julia Potocka (1818–1895), married Prince Franz de Paula of Liechtenstein
- Countess Zofia Ewa Potocka (1820–1882), married Count Moritz von Dietrichstein (1801–1852)

== Bibliography ==
- Polski Słownik Biograficzny t. 27 s. 760
