= Prince Aloys of Liechtenstein =

Prince Aloys of Liechtenstein may refer to:

- Aloys I, Prince of Liechtenstein
- Aloys II, Prince of Liechtenstein
- Prince Louis of Liechtenstein
- Prince Alois of Liechtenstein (1869–1955)
- Alois, Hereditary Prince of Liechtenstein
