= Wilhelm Gause =

German painter

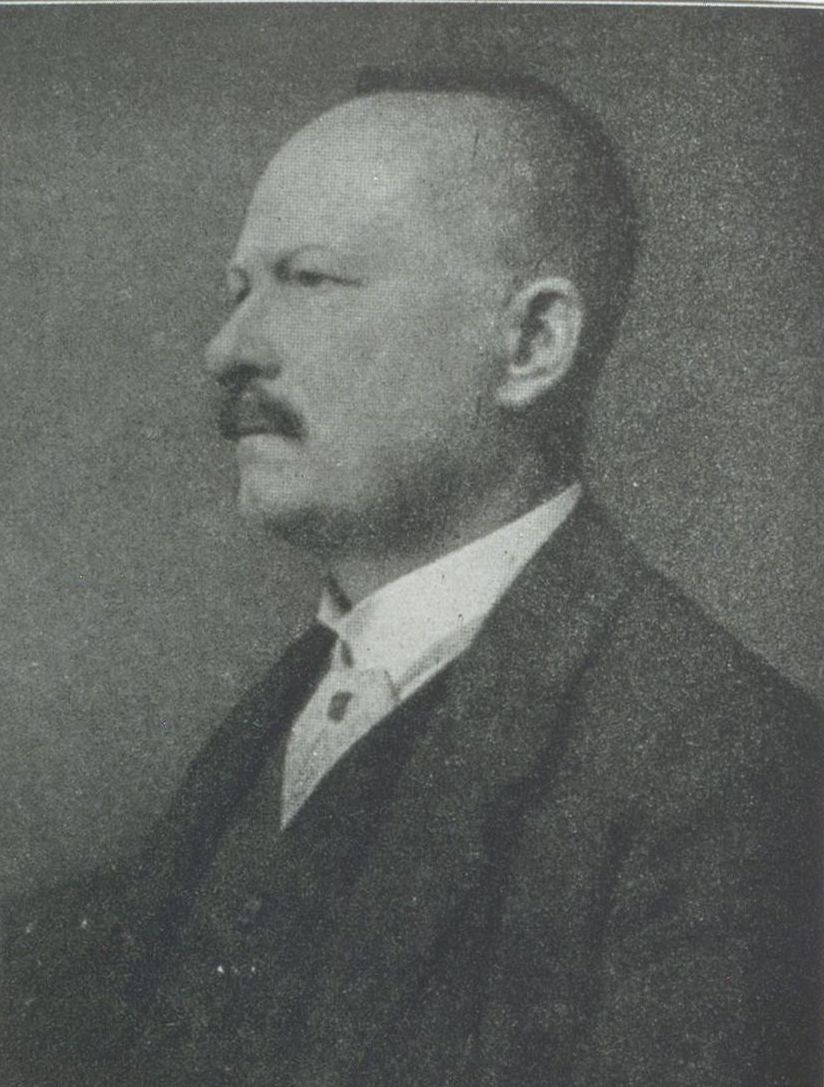
- Illustrierte Zeitung, 1916
- Born: Wilhelm Gause; 27 March 1853; Krefeld, Kingdom of Prussia
- Died: 13 June 1916 (aged 63); Krems an der Donau, Austria-Hungary
- Known for: Painting, drawing

Wilhelm Gause (27 March 1853 – 13 June 1916) was a German-Austrian painter. He studied at the Düsseldorf Academy, and in 1888 exhibited his work in Vienna.

== Works ==
Perhaps Gause's most famous work is Court Ball at the Hofburg. Created in 1900, it hangs today within the walls of the Wien Museum Karlsplatz, Vienna, Austria. It depicts aristocrats crowding around Franz Joseph I of Austria at the Hofburg Imperial Palace.

On 28 January 2011, Another painting of his, Party on the Ice, 1909 was sold at Sotheby's in New York for $13,750.

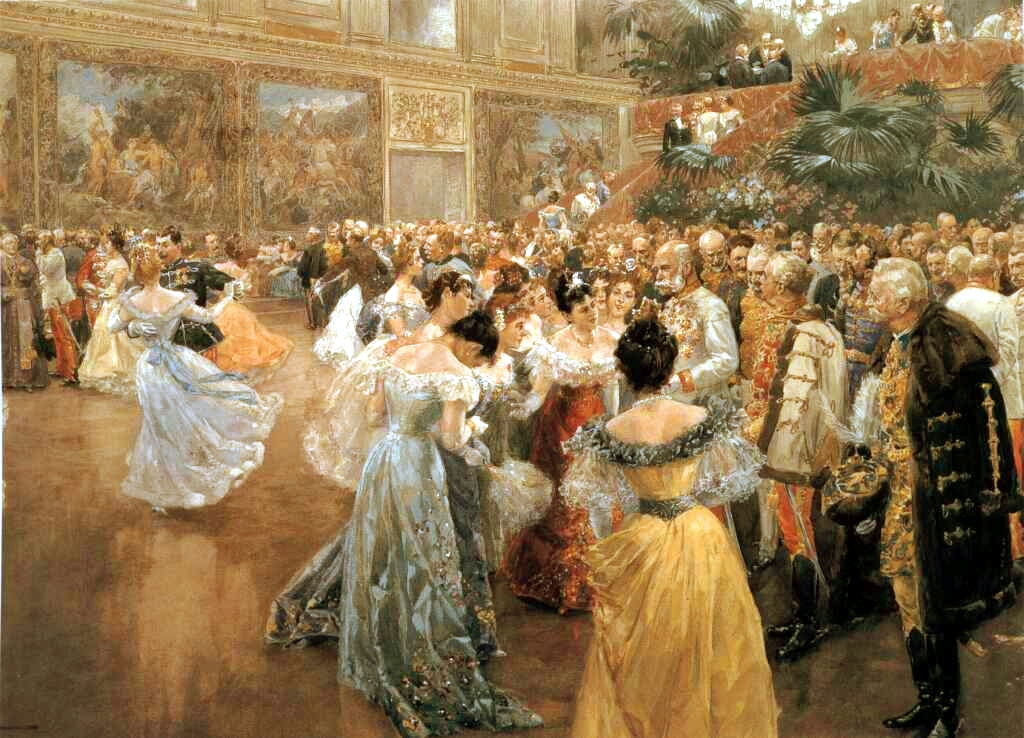
Court Ball at the Hofburg, 1900 portraying the Emperor Franz Josef I, Historical Museum of the City of Vienna

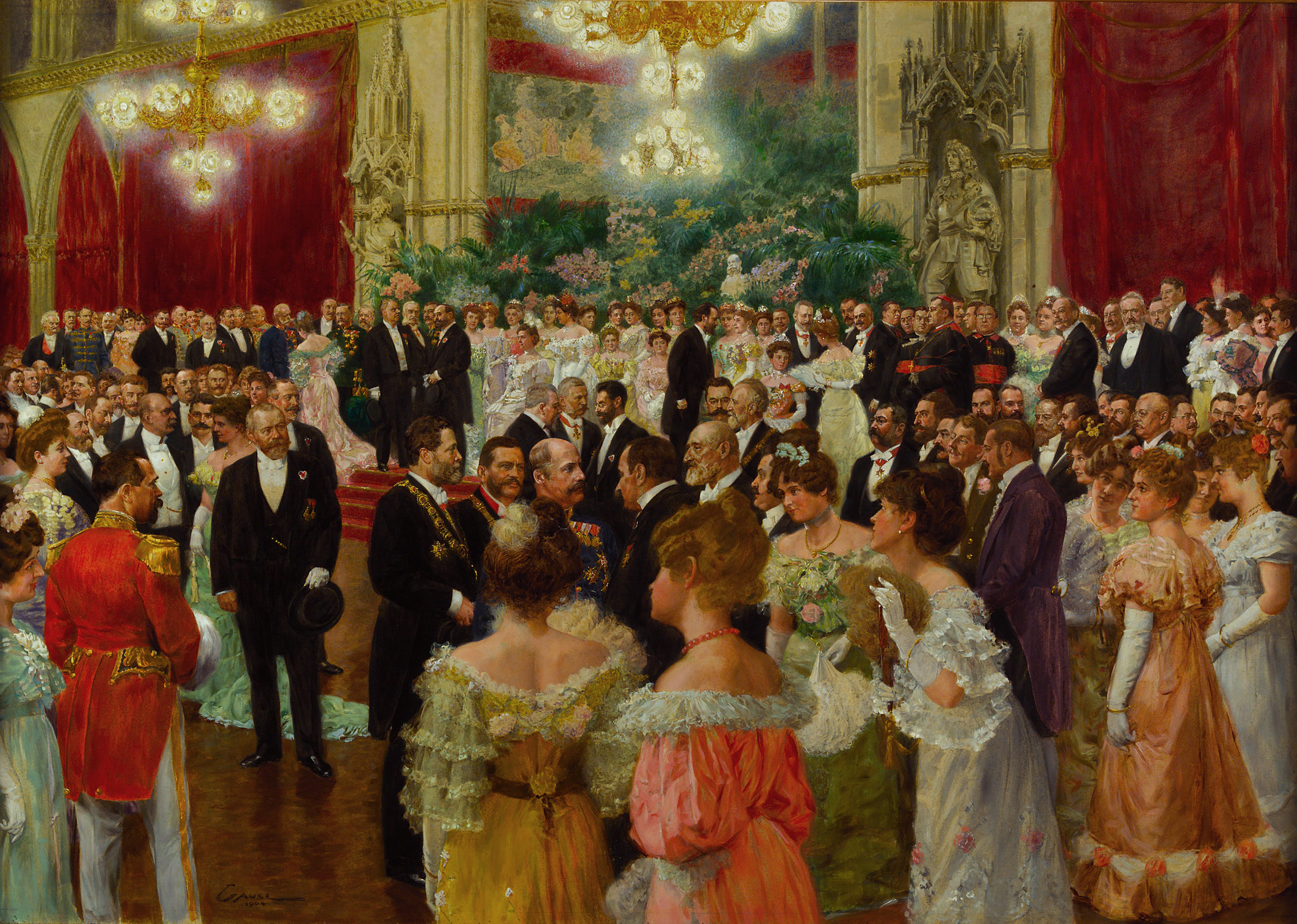
Ball at the Vienna City Hall 1904 portraying the Mayor of Vienna Karl Lueger, Historical Museum of the City of Vienna

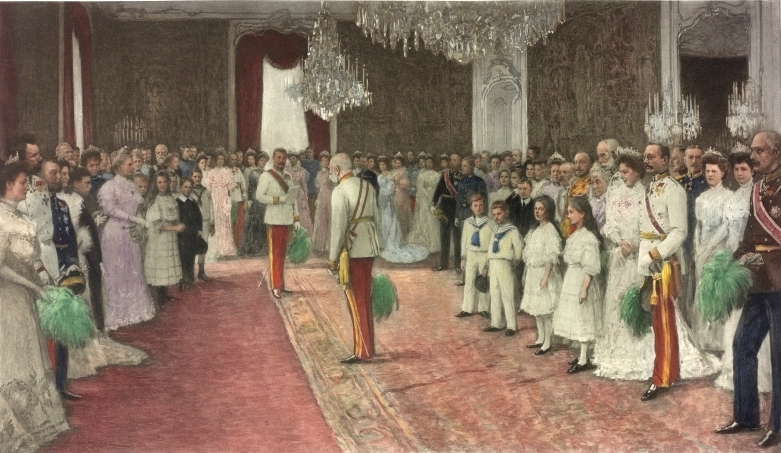

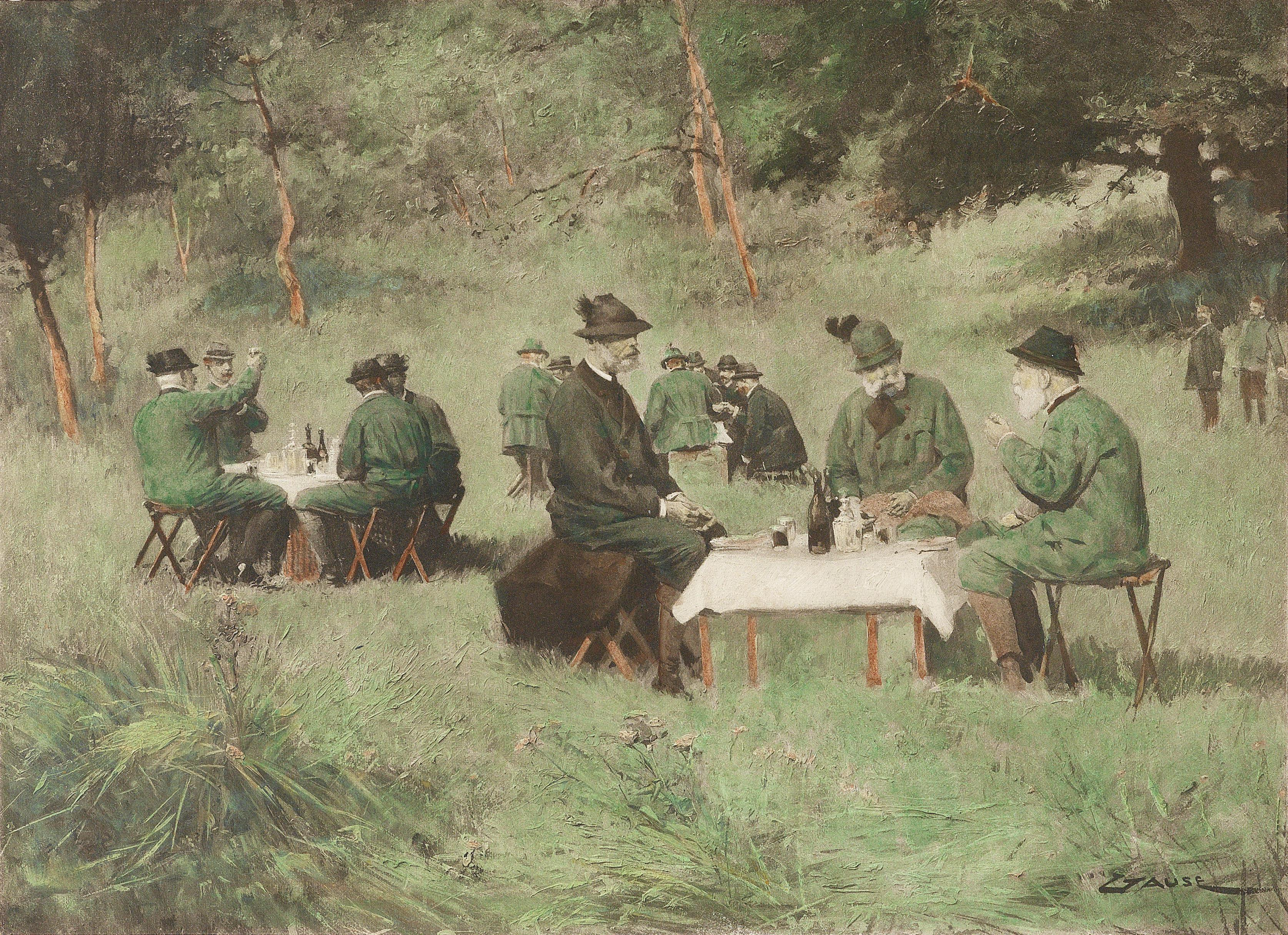
Kaiser Franz Joseph beim Jagd-Picknick (1908)

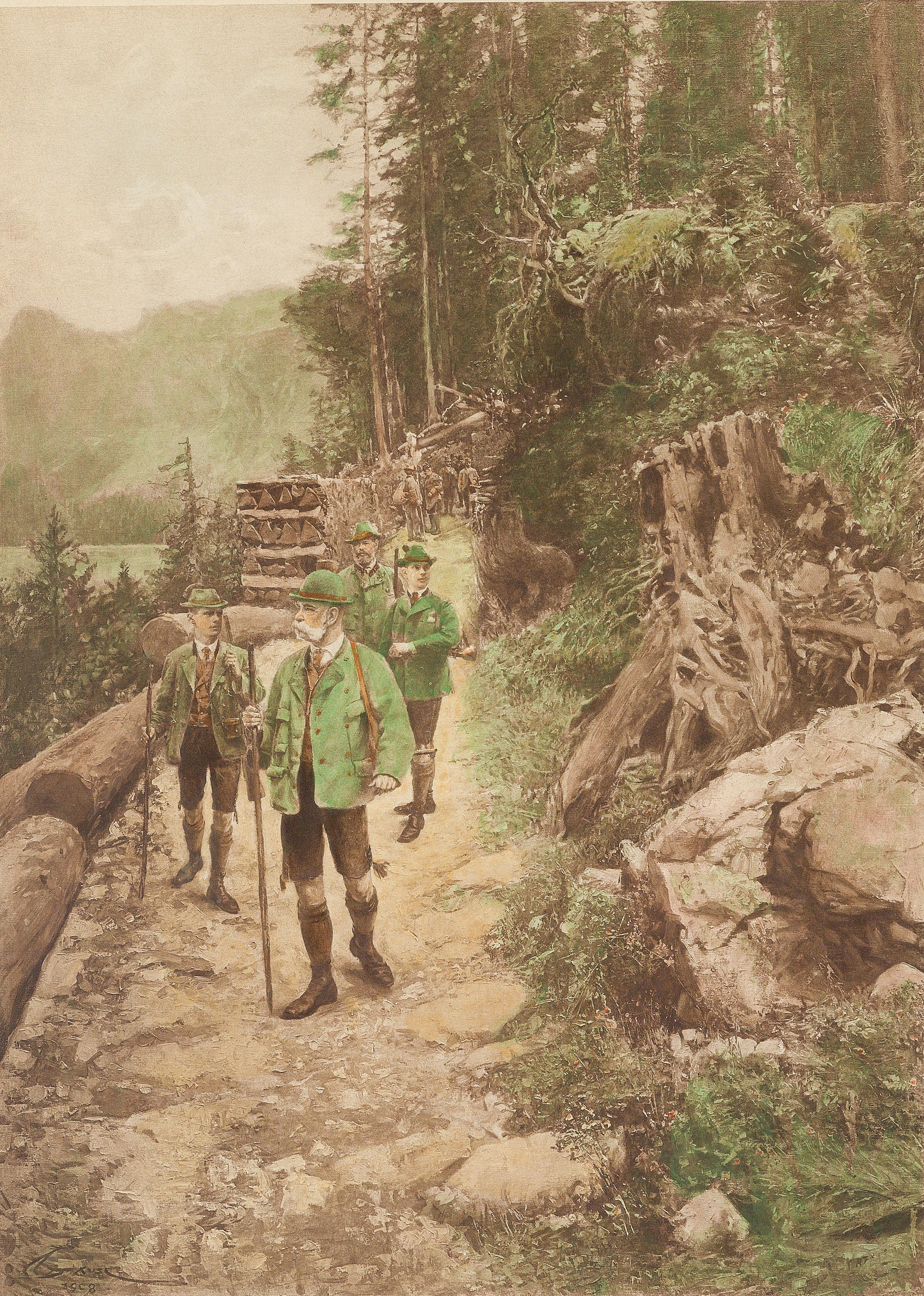
Kaiser Franz Joseph auf der Jagd (1908)

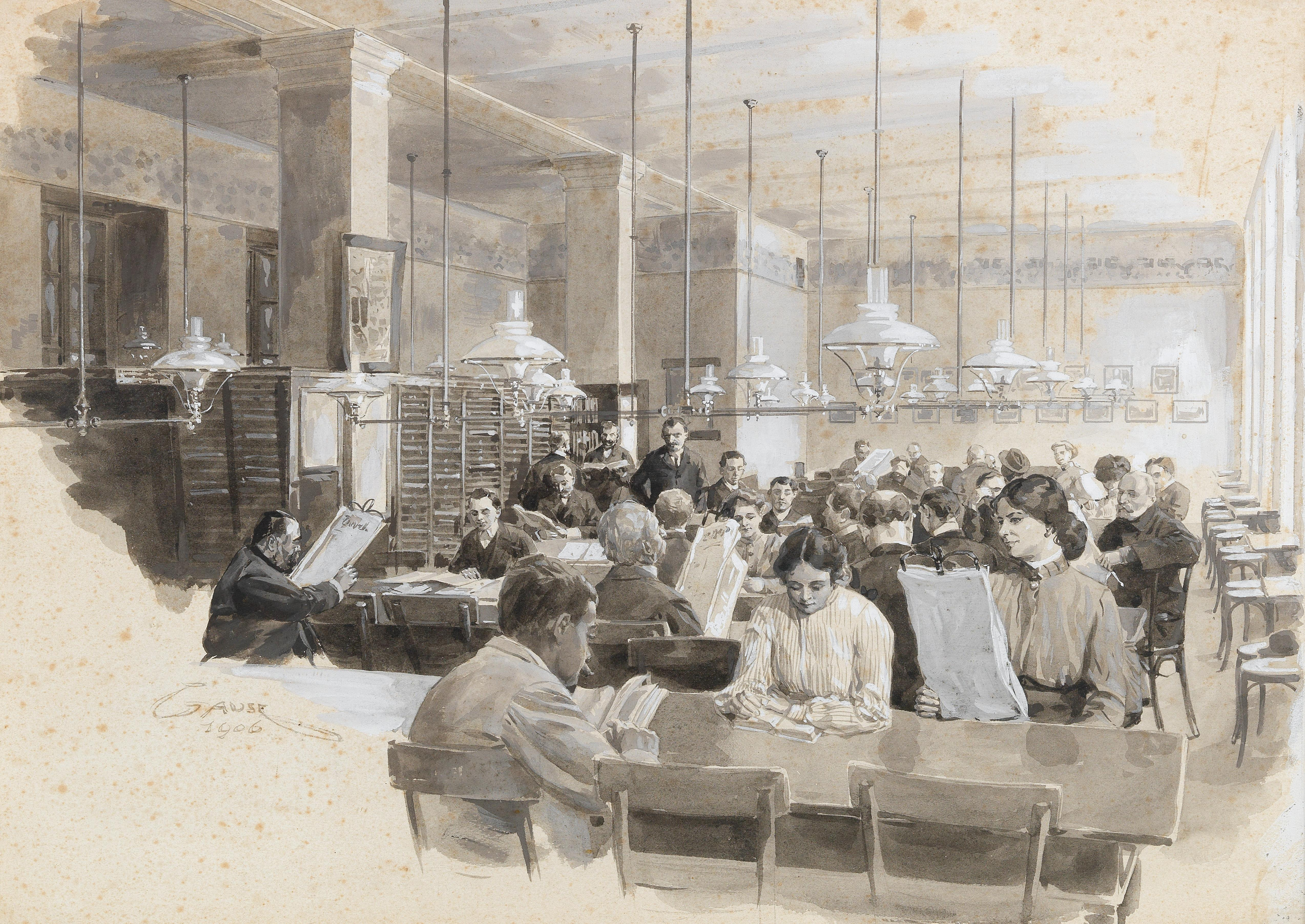
In einem Lesesaal (In a reading hall) (1906)

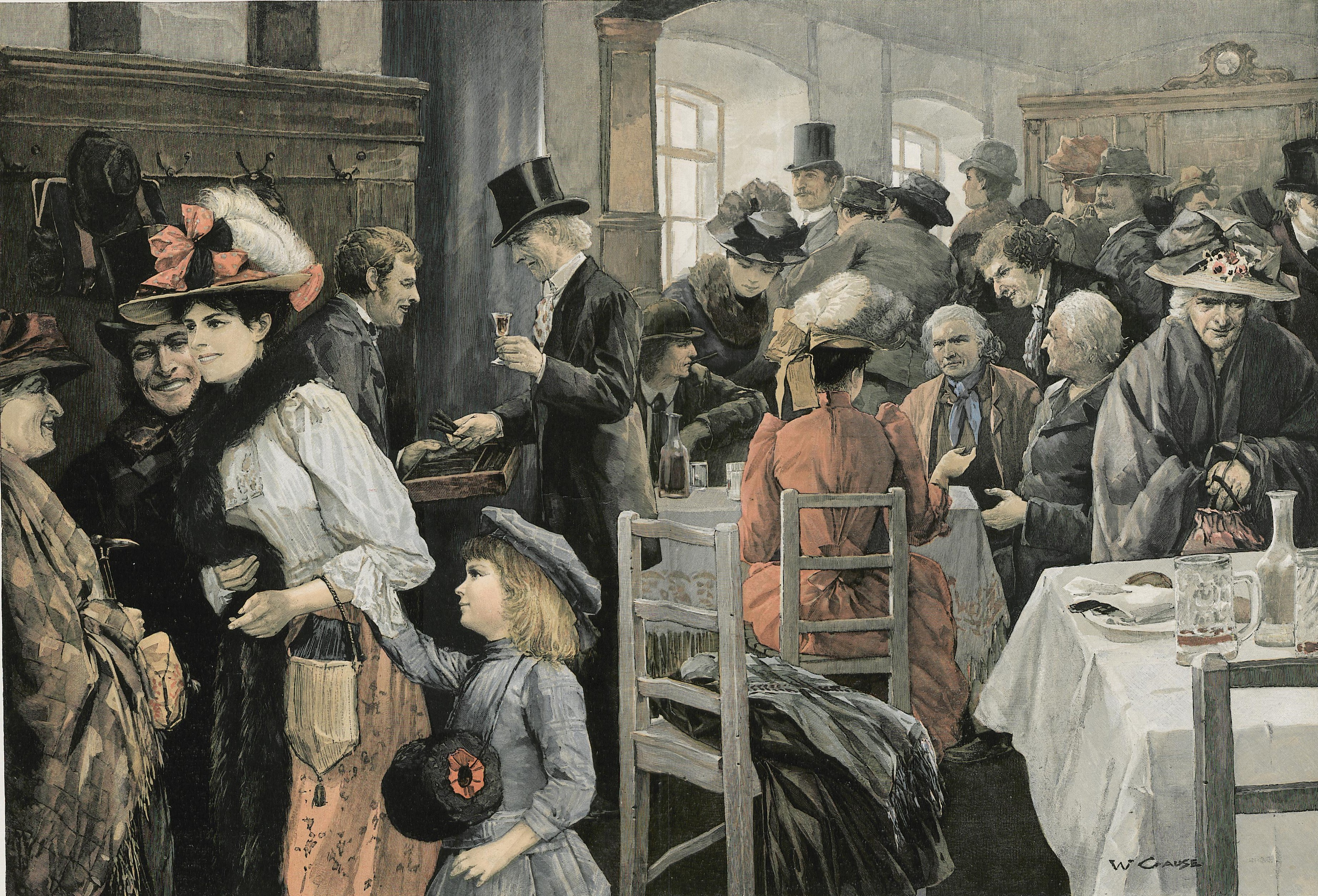
Eine Künstlerkneipe in Wien

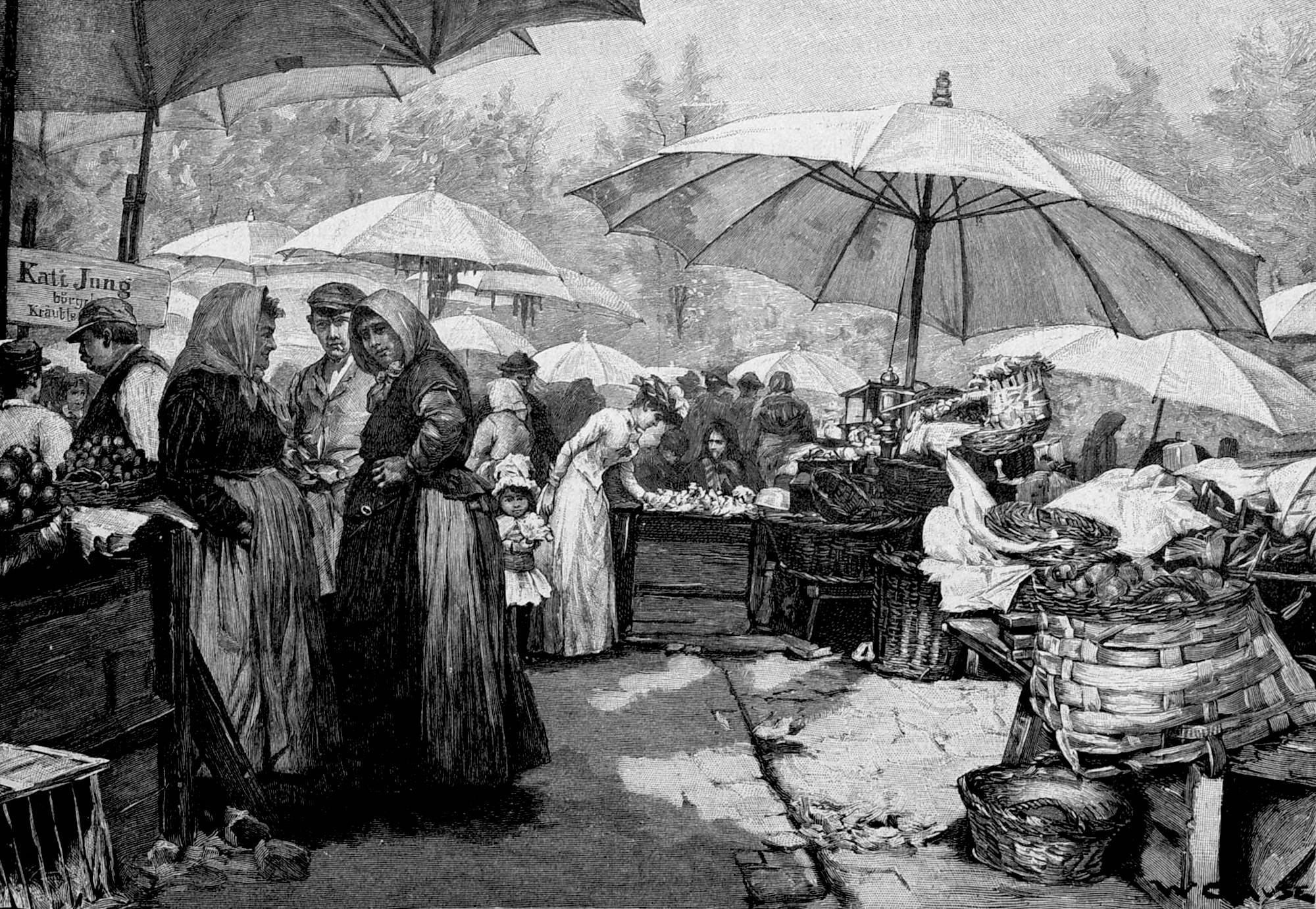
Bild aus Seite 501 in "Die Gartenlaube". Image from page 501 of journal Die Gartenlaube, 1891.

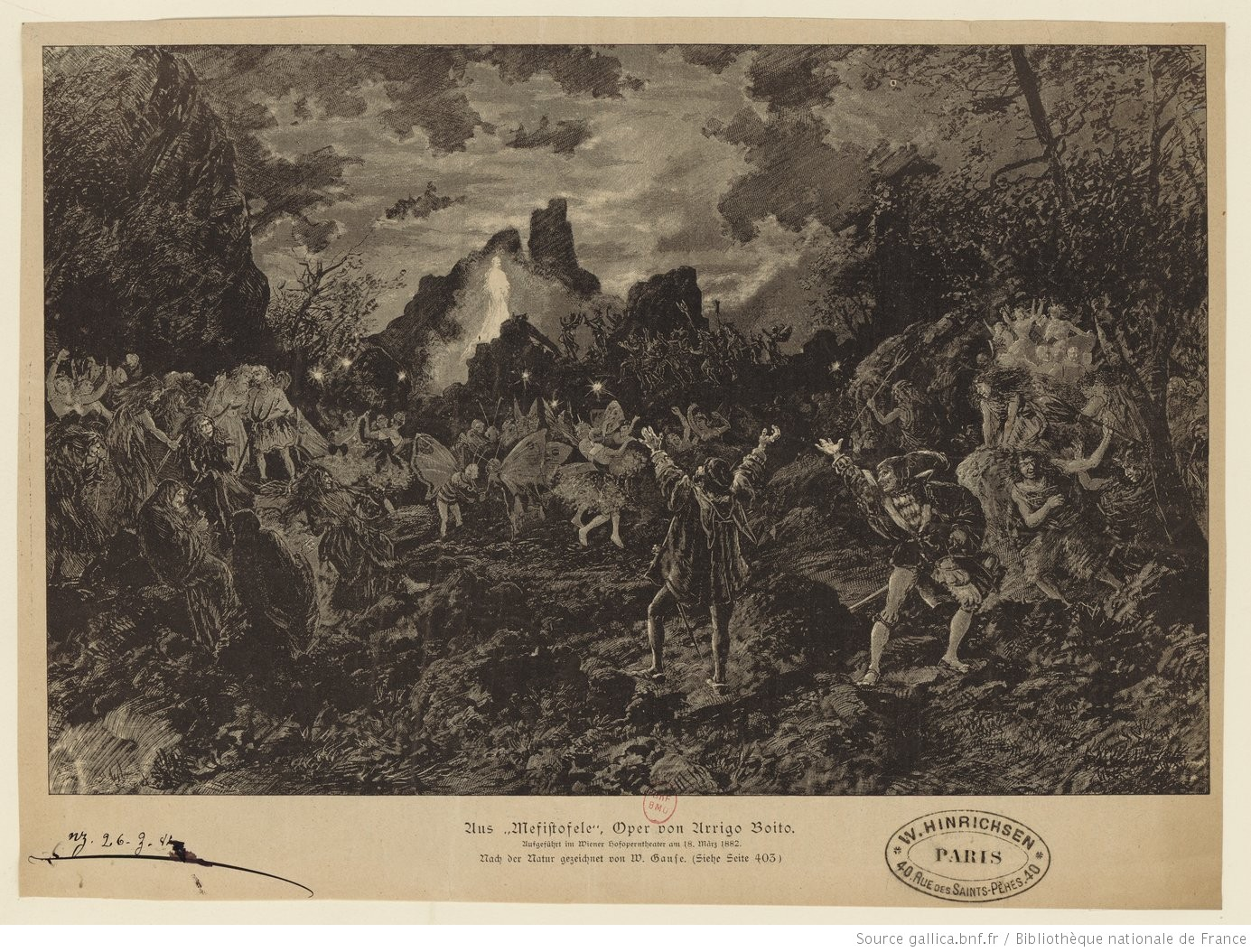

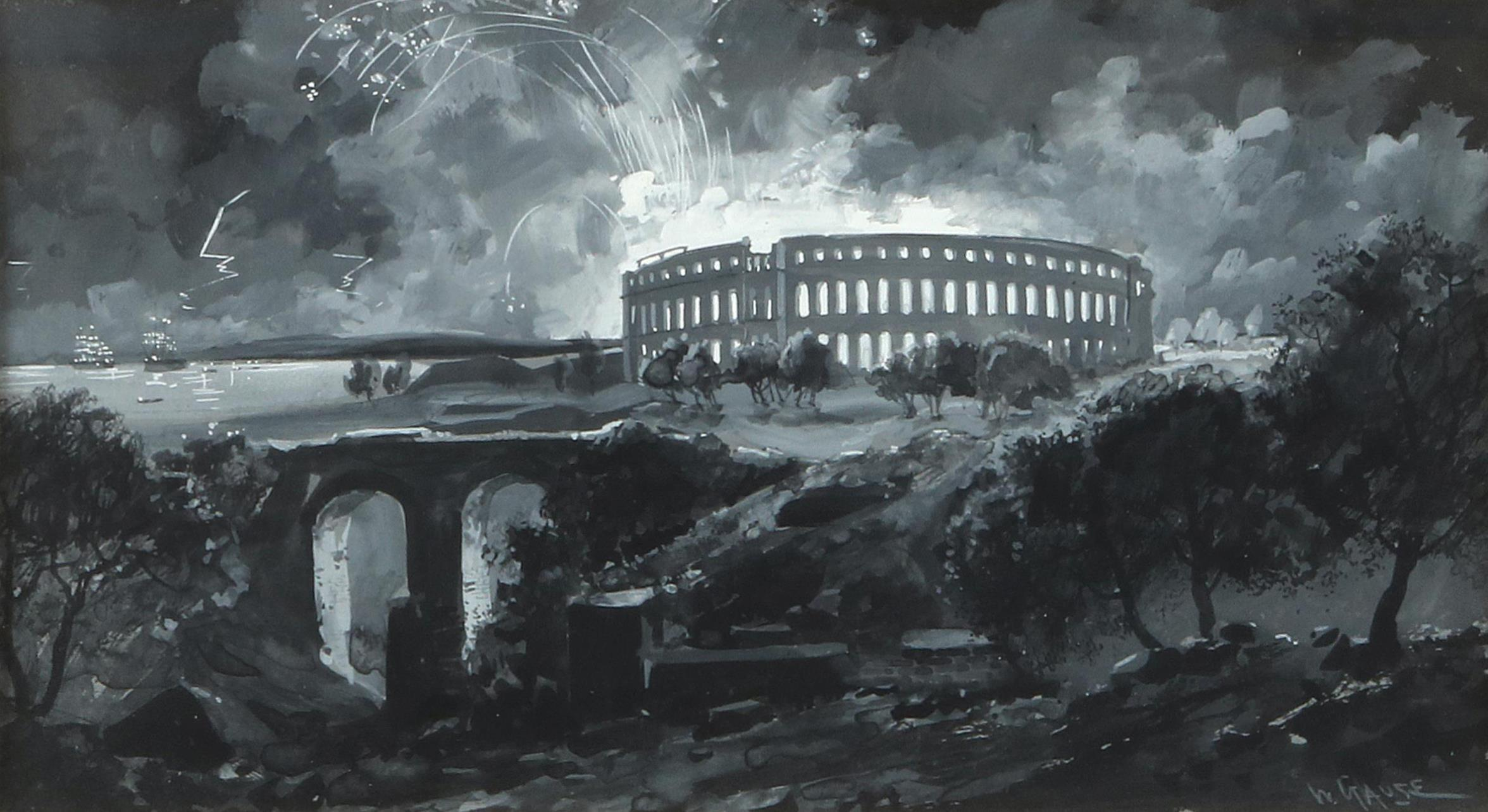
Beleuchtung und Illumination des Amphitheaters von Pola
