= Julia Potocka =

- Princess Franz de Paula of Liechtenstein
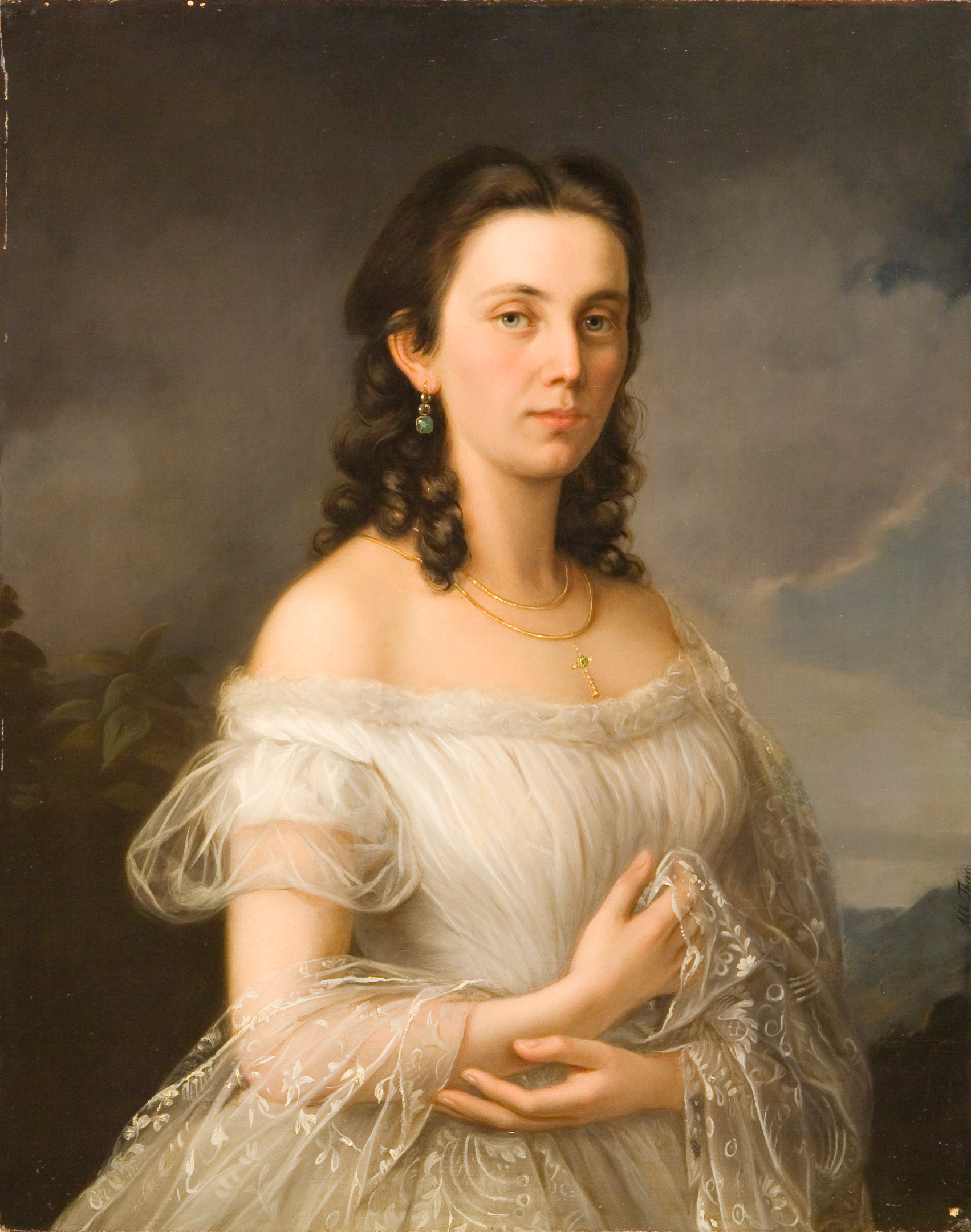
- Portrait by Albert Theer
- Born: 10 August 1818; Paris, France
- Died: 21 May 1895 (aged 77); Vienna, Austria-Hungary
- Spouse: Prince Franz de Paula of Liechtenstein (m. 1841; died 1887)
- Issue: Prince Alfred of Liechtenstein; Princess Josefina Marie Juliane; Prince Aloys Franz de Paula Maria; Prince Heinrich Karl August
Names
- Ewa Józefina Julia Eudoksja Potocka
- Family: Potocki
- Father: Count Alfred Wojciech Potocki
- Mother: Princess Józefina Maria Czartoryska

Countess Ewa Józefina Julia Eudoksja Potocka hr. Piława (born 10 August 1818 in Paris – 21 May 1895 in Vienna) was a Polish noble lady of the Potocki family.

== Early life ==
She was the daughter of Count Alfred Wojciech Potocki and Princess Józefina Maria Czartoryska. Her brother Count Alfred Józef Potocki was the 2nd Ordynat of the Łańcut Fee Tail.

== Marriage and issue ==
Julia married on 3 June 1841, in Vienna, Prince Franz de Paula of Liechtenstein and had four children:

- Prince Alfred of Liechtenstein (1842–1907)
- Princess Josefina Marie Juliane (Vienna, 22 April 1844 – Vienna, 10 October 1854)
- Prince Aloys Franz de Paula Maria (Prague, 19 November 1846 – Vienna, 25 March 1920), married firstly in London on 27 June 1872 Marie "Mary" Henriette Adelaide Fox (Paris, 21 December 1850 – Schloss Burgstall, Styria, 26 December 1878), adopted daughter of Henry Edward Fox, 4th Baron Holland and wife Lady Mary Augusta Coventry, believed to be his own natural daughter, and had issue, four daughters, and married secondly in Vienna on 20 May 1890 Johanna Elisabeth Maria von Klinkosch (Vienna, 13 August 1849 – Baden bei Wien, 31 January 1925), daughter of Joseph Ritter von Klinkosch and wife Elise Swoboda, without issue:
  - Princess Sophie Maria Josepha (Berlin, 29 March 1873 – Graz, 2 March 1947), married in Graz on 31 July 1897 Franz Ürményi d'Ürmény (Ürmény, 14 January 1863 – Baden bei Wien, 20 February 1934), without issue
  - Princess Julie Margarethe Maria (Schloss Burgstall, 20 July 1874 – Mayerling, 3 July 1950), unmarried and without issue
  - Princess Henriette Maria Josefa (Schloss Burgstall, 6 July 1875 – Pertelstein, 21 April 1958), unmarried and without issue
  - Princess Marie Johanna Franziska (Schloss Burgstall, 21 August 1877 – Vienna, 11 January 1939), married in Vienna on 7 June 1902 Franz, Graf von Meran, Freiherr von Brandhofen (Graz, 5 October 1868 – Bad Aussee, 10 November 1949), and had issue
- Prince Heinrich Karl August (Budapest, 6 November 1853 – Vienna, 15 February 1914), unmarried and without issue
