= Marianne Beskiba =

Portrait painter, and mistress and biographer of Vienna mayor Karl Lueger (1869-1934)

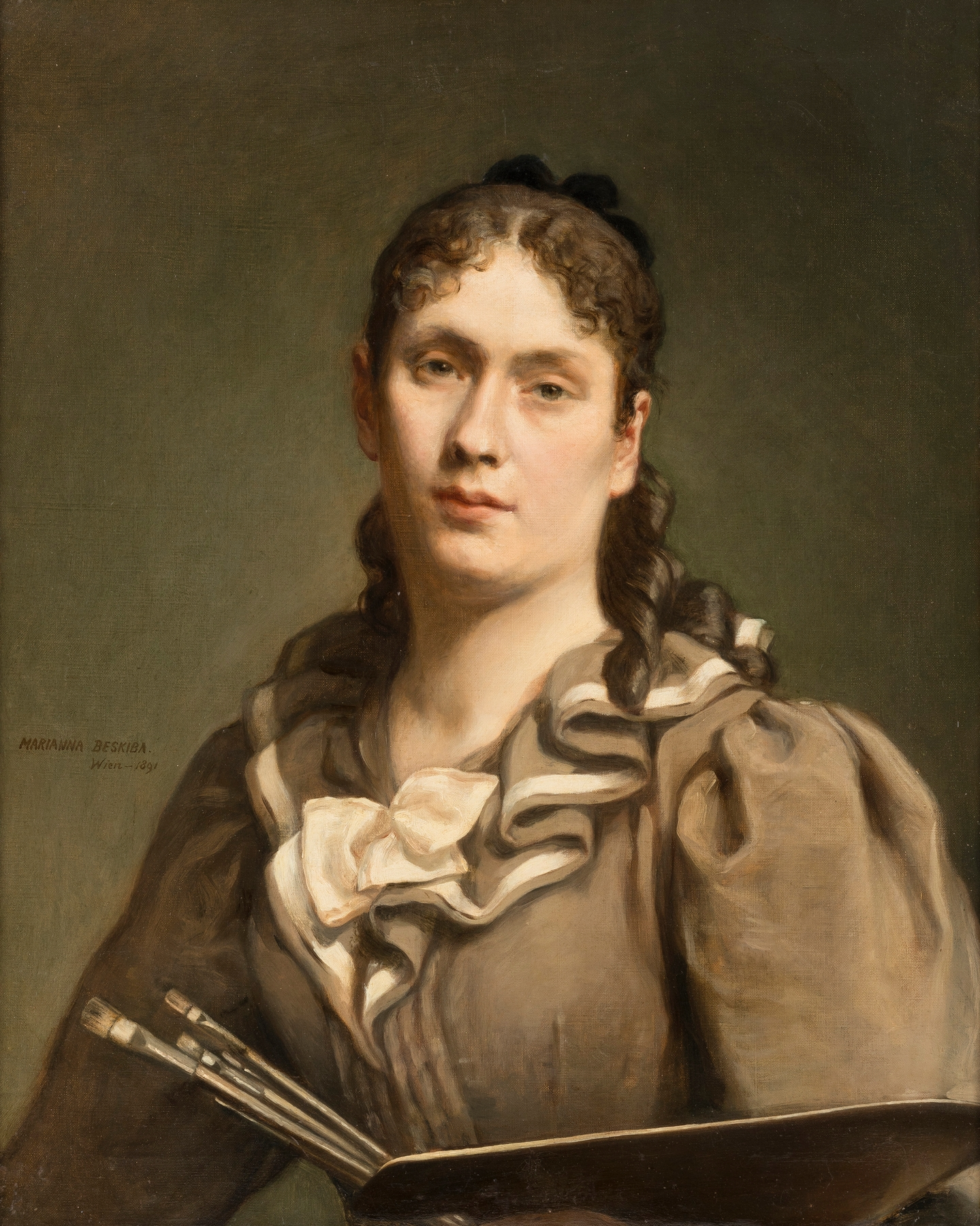
Self-portrait, 1891

Marianne Beskiba (2 April 1869 – 16 April 1934) was a portrait painter who was the long-time mistress of Karl Lueger, the mayor of Vienna from 1897 to 1910. Her book about him, published after his death, created a sensation and is an important source of information on his political tactics.

Beskiba was the niece of the illustrator Franz Kollarz, and like him trained at the Vienna Academy of Arts; she was a student of Christian Griepenkerl. In 1894, shortly after the deaths of her widowed mother and her own fiancé, her uncle and his three surviving sisters committed suicide in their hotel at the pilgrimage site of Maria Lanzendorf; she had accompanied them there from Vienna but had to return early because of work.

Beskiba was a society painter. In 1895 she was commissioned to paint the portrait of Karl Lueger, 25 years her senior and at that time a candidate for mayor of Vienna; they fell in love. She was his mistress until 1909, when he ended the relationship. Beskiba claimed that he had once promised to marry her. However, a significant political strategy of Lueger's was to appeal to women; his female followers were known as his "Amazon corps", "the Lueger Garde" or "Lueger Gretls". He calculated that even though women did not have the right to vote, they had considerable influence on their husbands. To sustain his appeal to them, he maintained the fiction that he was too busy for a private life since he belonged so totally to the people of Vienna. According to Beskiba, he made her burn his letters and doused the ashes with champagne.

After Lueger's death in 1910, Beskiba attempted suicide, and self-published a tell-all account of her time with him, Aus meinen Erinnerungen an Dr. Karl Lueger. With its facsimiles of love letters from Lueger to her, it caused an uproar. Although it has been described by one historian as "often spiteful, morose, and occasionally hysterical", it is a valuable source of information on his political tactics and decisions; she was an intelligent and insightful observer.

In January 1912, Beskiba was turned down for financial support by the Austrian Artists' Society on grounds of insufficient artistic merit. She died in poverty in 1934 and was buried in a pauper's grave.
