= Karl Lueger =

Austrian politician (1844–1910)

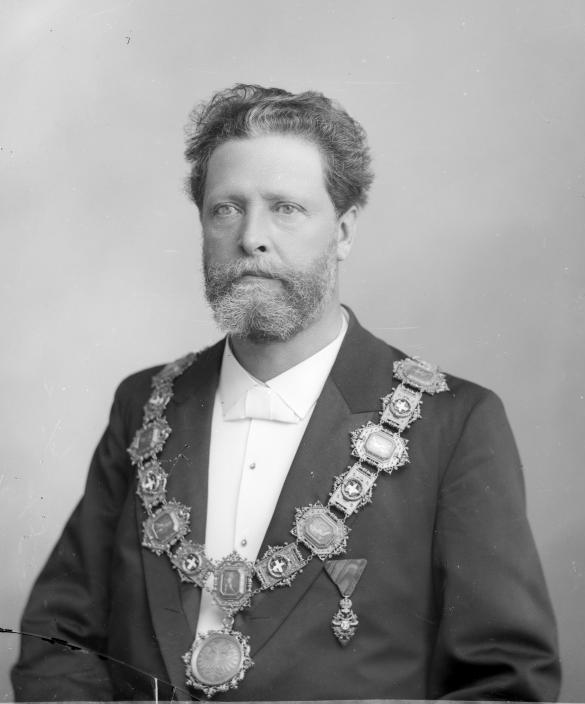
- Lueger in c. 1897

Mayor of Vienna
- In office 8 April 1897 – 10 March 1910
- Preceded by: Josef Strobach
- Succeeded by: Josef Neumayer

Personal details
- Born: 24 October 1844 Wieden, Austrian Empire (current-day Austria)
- Died: 10 March 1910 (aged 65) Vienna, Austria-Hungary (current-day Austria)
- Party: Christian Social Party
- Education: University of Vienna (Dr. iur.utr.)
- Profession: Lawyer

Karl Lueger (German: [ˈlu̯eːɡɐ]; 24 October 1844 – 10 March 1910) was an Austrian lawyer and politician who served as Mayor of Vienna from 1897 until his death in 1910. He is credited with the transformation of Vienna into a modern city at the turn of the 20th century, although the populist and antisemitic politics of the Austrian Christian Social Party (CS), which he founded and led until his death, remain controversial, as they are sometimes viewed as a model for Adolf Hitler's Nazism.

== Life and early career ==
Karl Lueger came from a modest background, born at Wieden (since 1850 the 4th district of Vienna) to Leopold Lueger of Neustadtl an der Donau and his wife Juliane.

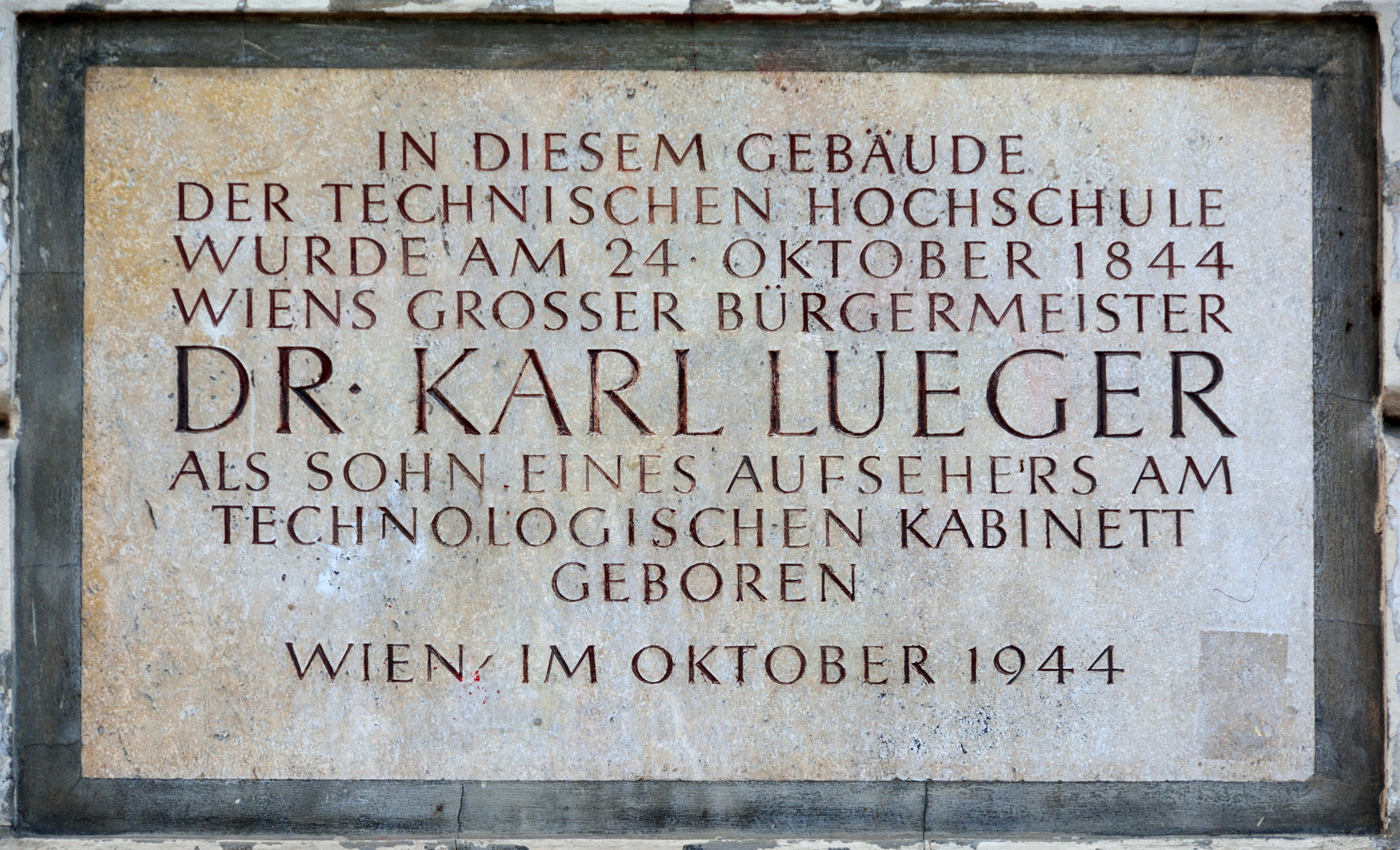
Plaque at Lueger's birthplace

His birthplace is now the western part of the main building of the Vienna University of Technology at Karlsplatz where Lueger's father worked as an usher at the Vienna Polytechnic.

He nevertheless was able to attend the Theresianum boarding school (Theresianische Ritterakademie) as a day student. He studied law at the University of Vienna, receiving his doctorate in 1870. While at the university he was a member of the Catholic Student Association (Katholische akademische Verbindung Norica Wien, K.A.V. Norica Wien), part of the Österreichische Cartellverband (ÖCV) fraternities.

He established his own lawyer's office in Vienna in 1874 and soon became known as a "little people's" („kleine Leute“) advocate. In this position, his role model and mentor was the popular Jewish physician and local politician Ignaz Mandl, known as "God of the Little People" in Lueger's district of Landstraße (Third District), whom he followed into political life. The association ended when Lueger became identified with antisemitism. He died in 1910.

== Political career ==
Lueger played a part in many political spheres, including Vienna City Council where he eventually became mayor, the federal Austrian parliament, and the state parliament of Lower Austria.

=== Viennese municipal politics ===
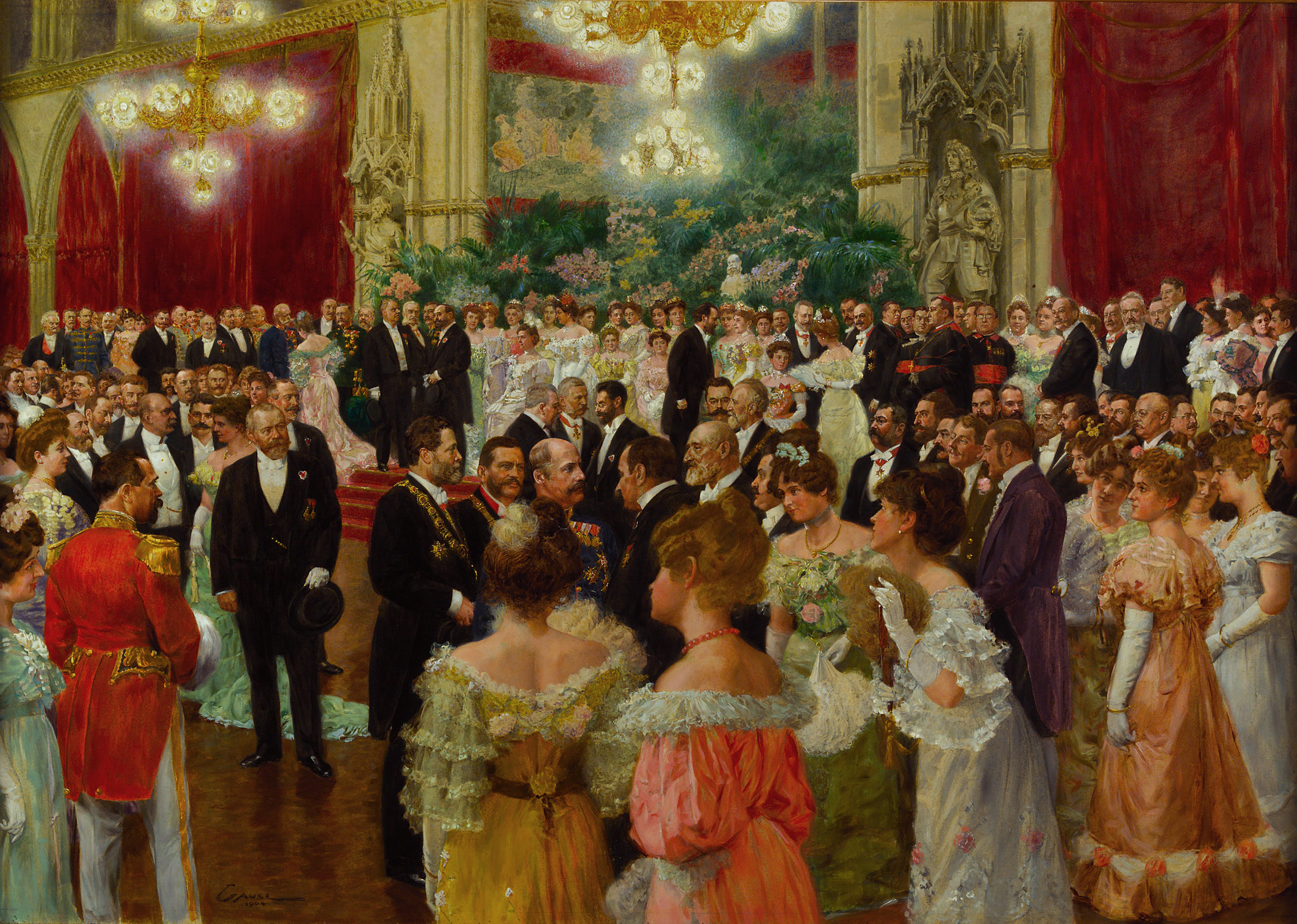
Karl Lueger at a ball in Vienna City Hall 1904, by Wilhelm Gause, Historical Museum of the City of Vienna

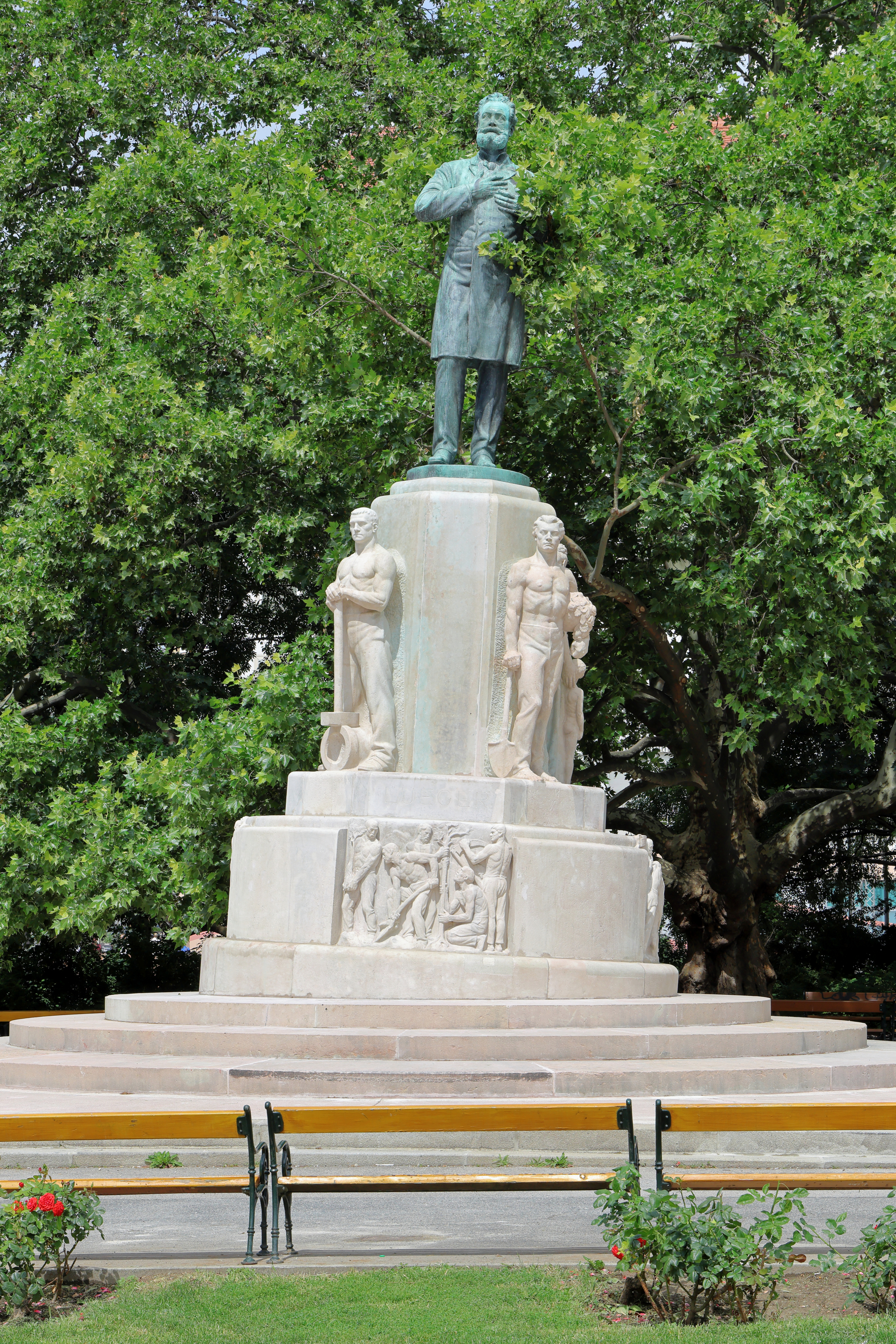
The monument to Lueger at Dr.-Karl-Lueger-Platz became a target of vandalism and art interventions from 1973 onwards. In 2026, it was tilted 3.5 degrees to the right.

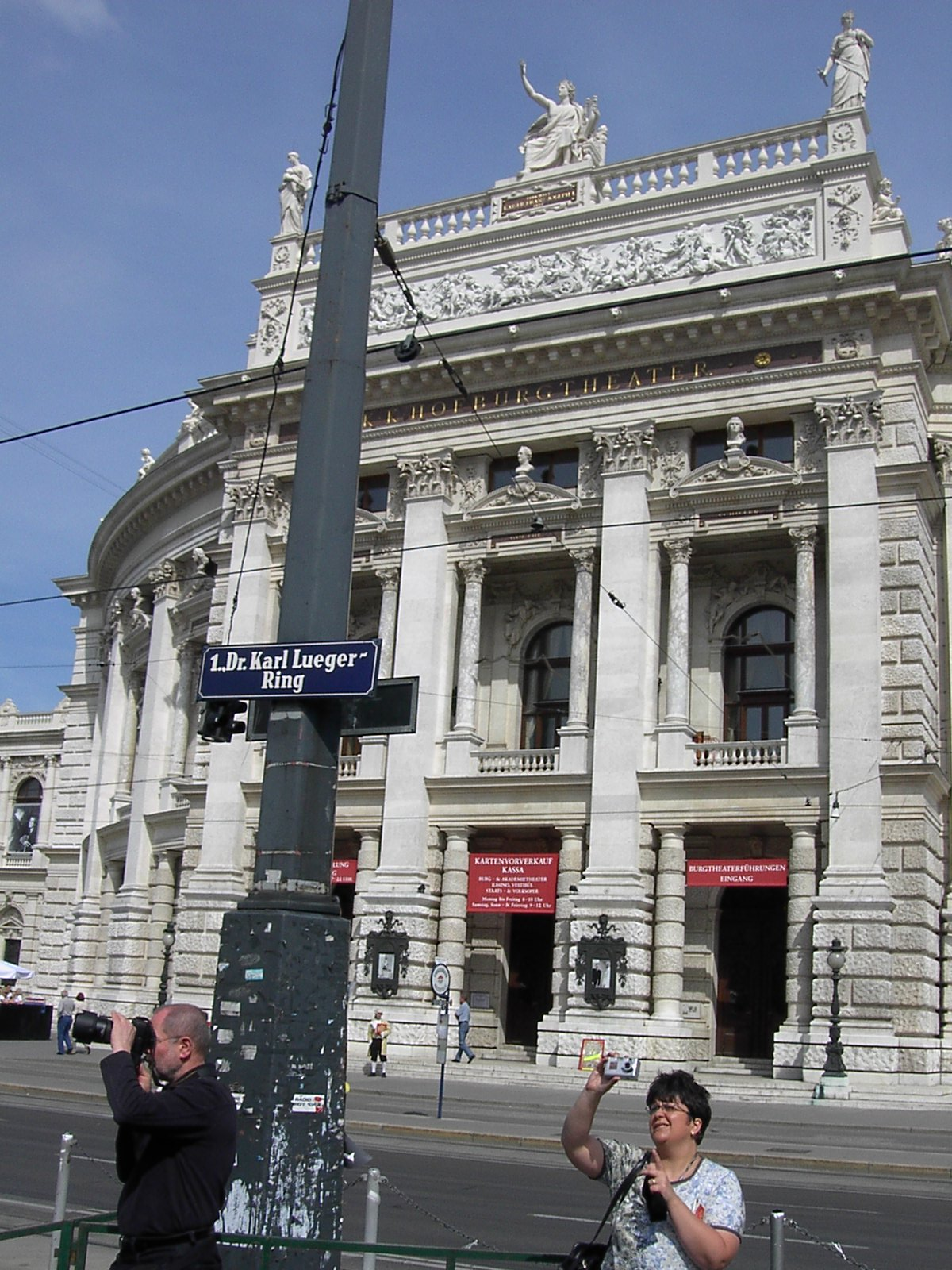
Burgtheater on Universitäts-Ring, formerly Doktor-Karl-Lueger-Ring and part of Vienna's famous Ringstraße

In 1875, he was elected to Vienna's City Council (Gemeinderat), initially as a liberal. He would serve on the council until his death, save for a two-year break from 1876 to 1878. He campaigned against the government of liberal mayor Cajetan Felder and achieved popularity as a campaigner against corruption.

In 1888 he brought together the German National (Deutschnationale) and Christian Social factions at City Hall to form a group that later became known as the United Christians (Vereinigte Christen).

After the 1895 elections for the Vienna Gemeinderat, the Christian Socials won two thirds of the seats, ending the long Liberal rule. The Christian Social supermajority subsequently elected Lueger as mayor. However, during imperial times, mayors had to be confirmed in office by Emperor Franz Joseph. The emperor allegedly loathed Lueger as a person and considered him a dangerous revolutionary. He was also concerned about Lueger's antisemitism. With the support of Prime Minister Kasimir Felix Badeni, Franz Joseph refused to confirm Lueger as mayor. The Christian Socials retained a large majority in the council, and reelected Lueger as mayor three more times, only to have Franz Joseph refuse to confirm him each time. He was elected mayor for a fifth time in 1897, and after a personal intercession by Pope Leo XIII, his election was finally sanctioned later that year.

He was a zealous Catholic and wished to “capture the university” for the Church. He would have neither Social Democrats nor Pan-Germans nor Jews in the municipal administration. He secured good treatment for Czech immigrants.

He planned to make Vienna one of the most beautiful of garden cities.

In his incumbency, Lueger is credited with the extension of the public water supply by its second main aquifer (Hochquellwasserleitung), which provides tap water of mineral-water quality to large parts of the city. He also pursued the municipalization of gas and electricity works as well as the establishment of a public transport system, introducing streetcars (trams), and of numerous institutions of social welfare, most of which strongly relied on debt financing. He incorporated the suburbs, and built parks, gardens, hospitals, and schools.

Der schöne Karl ("handsome Karl") achieved tremendous popularity among the citizens. During his tenure, Vienna ultimately changed its appearance as the capital of a great power of the pre-World War I era—a heritage that remained even in Red Vienna after the dissolution of Austria-Hungary in 1918. A significant part of the infrastructure and organisations that are responsible for the high standard of living in the contemporary city were created during his terms of office.

Lueger served as mayor of Vienna until his early death from diabetes mellitus in 1910. He was buried in the crypt of the newly erected St. Charles Borromeo Church at the Zentralfriedhof (also called Dr. Karl Lueger Memorial Church), whose groundbreaking ceremony he had performed.

=== Christian Social movement ===
Lueger's early political life was associated with Georg von Schönerer and the German National Party, which was antisemitic. From the late 1880s onwards Lueger was a regular attendee at the influential circles of clerical social conservative politicians around Karl von Vogelsang, Prince Aloys Franz de Paula Maria of Liechtenstein, and the theologian Franz Martin Schindler. In view of the rising labour movement, the participants on the basis of Catholic social teaching developed ideas to overcome social polarisation by several measures of social security legislation and the common Catholic faith. Moreover, after an 1882 electoral reform had expanded the electorate suffrage, Lueger focused on petty bourgeois tradespersons, who assumed the Jewish competition to be the underlying cause of their precarious situation, and discovered that raising the "Jewish Question" earned him enormous popularity.

In 1885 he was elected to the lower house (Abgeordnetenhaus) of the Austrian Imperial Parliament (Reichsrat), representing the Fifth District of Vienna, and was returned in the 1891 election. From 1890 he was also a member of the Lower Austria parliament (Landtag).

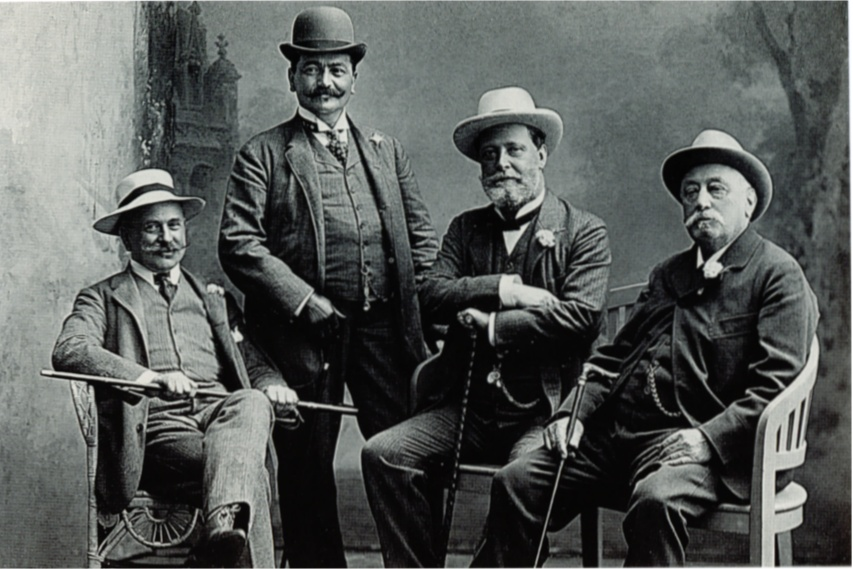
Lueger (2nd from right) with municipal CS leaders in 1905

Lueger, Prince Liechtenstein, Vogelsang and Schindler met regularly at the Hotel Zur goldenen Ente (Golden Duck, Riemergasse 4) in Vienna's First District, and would refer to their meetings as Enten-Abende (Duck Evenings). This working group became the focus for social reform, and they organised the Second Austrian Katholikentag in 1889. From this Schindler developed the platform of the fledgling Christian Social Party (Christlichsoziale Partei, CS). Lueger was to found and lead the party in 1893, which quickly rivaled the Social Democrats (Sozialdemokratische Partei Österreichs, SPÖ). He remained one of its most effective leaders till his death and developed his party's federation policy as a means of dealing with the monarchy's issues of multiple nationalities.

Much of Lueger's popularity stemmed from his appeal to women; his female followers were variously known as "Lueger's Amazons", "the Lueger Garde" or "Lueger Gretls" and were organised in the Christian Social Women's League. Although women could not vote, he calculated that they could significantly influence how their menfolk voted, and they also inculcated the party ideology in their children. To maintain his female following, Lueger remained a bachelor and publicly disavowed any private life, claiming that he was too busy because he belonged totally to "my Viennese". After his death there was a scandal when his long-time mistress, Marianne Beskiba, published a tell-all memoir including facsimiles of love letters from him; the book provides useful information about his political tactics and how the party was run.

=== Antisemitism ===
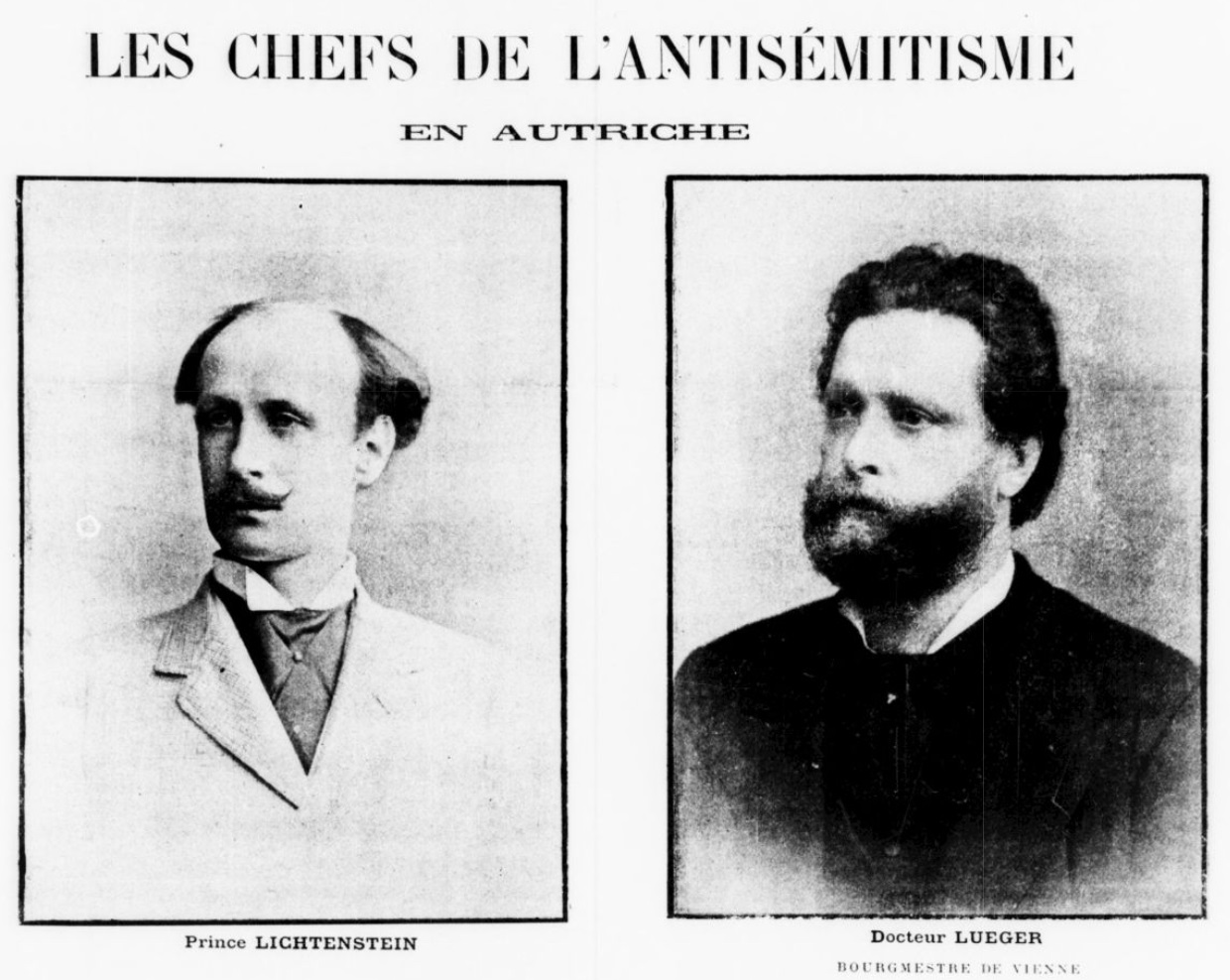
The leaders of Austrian antisemitism: Prince Louis of Liechtenstein and Karl Lueger (L'Antijuif, 1899)

Lueger was known for his antisemitic rhetoric and referred to himself as an admirer of Edouard Drumont, who founded the Antisemitic League of France in 1889. Decades later, Adolf Hitler, an inhabitant of Vienna from 1907 to 1913, saw him as an inspiration for his own antisemitism. Though not an explicit pan-Germanist, Lueger advocated racist policies against non-German speaking minorities in Austria-Hungary and in 1887 voted for a bill proposed by his long-time opponent Georg von Schönerer to restrict the immigration of Russian and Romanian Jews. He also overtly supported the völkisch movement of Guido von List and created the pun "Judapest", referring to supposed Jewish domination of the Hungarian capital, Budapest. The historian Léon Poliakov wrote in The History of Anti-Semitism:

It soon became apparent that especially in Vienna any political group that wanted to appeal to the artisans had no chance of success without an anti-Semitic platform. [...] It was at that time that a well-known phrase was coined in Vienna: "Anti-Semitism is the socialism of fools." The situation was exploited by the Catholic politician Karl Lueger, the leader of Austrian Christian-Social party with a program identical to that of the Berlin party of the same name led by Pastor Stoeker. In 1887, Lueger raised the banner of anti-Semitism. [...] However, the enthusiastic tribute that Hitler paid him in Mein Kampf does not seem justified, for the Jews did not suffer under his administration.

Other observers contend that Lueger's public racism was in large part a pose to obtain votes, being one of the first who made use of populism as a political tool. Historian William L. Shirer wrote that "his opponents, including the Jews, readily conceded that he was at heart a decent, chivalrous, generous and tolerant man." According to Amos Elon, "Lueger's anti-Semitism was of a homespun, flexible variety—one might almost say gemütlich. Asked to explain the fact that many of his friends were Jews, Lueger famously replied, "I decide who is a Jew." Viennese Jewish writer Stefan Zweig, who grew up in Vienna during Lueger's term of office, recalled that "His city administration was perfectly just and even typically democratic."

=== German nationalism ===
Lueger expressed some scepticism about German nationalism, but as with his antisemitism was quick to exploit the sentiments for his own political purposes. He opposed Austro-Hungarian dualism in favour of federalism and the equality of all the nations making up the empire.

=== Karl Lueger and the Romanians of Transylvania ===
Karl Lueger openly supported the rights of Transylvanian Romanians, who were subjected to a policy of Magyarization by the Kingdom of Hungary. In 1892, he publicly endorsed the national demands expressed in the Transylvanian Memorandum and invited the Romanian delegation to Vienna. During a rally, Lueger condemned the “boorish attacks” in the Hungarian press, as well as the attitude of Hungarian leaders who, in his words, “hold the helm in their hands and use it to oppress the Slavic and the Romanian nations.” Lueger emphasized the Romanians’ loyalty to the House of Habsburg, stating that “the Romanians are like lambs against wolves,” and in his view, “the Romanian peasant’s sheepskin coat is just as worthy as the Hungarian shirt.” Lueger also supported the efforts of Romanians in Vienna to build a Romanian Orthodox church in the imperial capital.

For his pro-Romanian stance, Lueger was appreciated even in the Kingdom of Romania. In 1906, on the occasion of the 40th anniversary of King Carol I’s reign, Lueger was invited to a major exhibition in Carol Park. He expressed his admiration for the Romanian people and criticized the policies of the Hungarian government, also inviting the mayor of Bucharest to pay an official visit to Vienna together with a delegation of the Municipal Council.

The future Romanian prime minister, Alexandru Vaida-Voevod, while a medical student in Vienna, was strongly influenced by Lueger. He took part in Lueger’s electoral campaign, organizing demonstrations in Vienna with racist slogans and even proposing to his colleagues that they burn the Hungarian flag as a form of protest.

== Legacy ==
Lueger's general style of politics later inspired some of the right-wing leaders of the First Austrian Republic in 1918–1933, such as Ignaz Seipel, Engelbert Dollfuss and Kurt Schuschnigg, who led Austria into a dictatorship. Unlike Hitler, he did not so much inspire antisemitism in them (none of these three were particularly antisemitic), but rather provided one important role model for their generally combative, unrelenting stance towards ideological political opponents, which ultimately proved to be detrimental to the cohesion of the Austrian state.

In Vienna, Lueger has a square named after him, at least two statues were erected in his honour, and until April 2012 a section of the Ringstraße bore his name. It has been very difficult to decide what to do with monuments honouring historical figures whose reputation has been widely called into question as Europeans (and others) reflect on the historical background to the Holocaust. With the Anschluss of Austria in 1938 street names carrying Jewish names or the names of pacifists were changed. After World War II, Austria started a full-scale program of de-Nazification on both cultural and topographical levels. Nazified street signs were torn down and their names changed back from Nazi to Habsburg heroes.

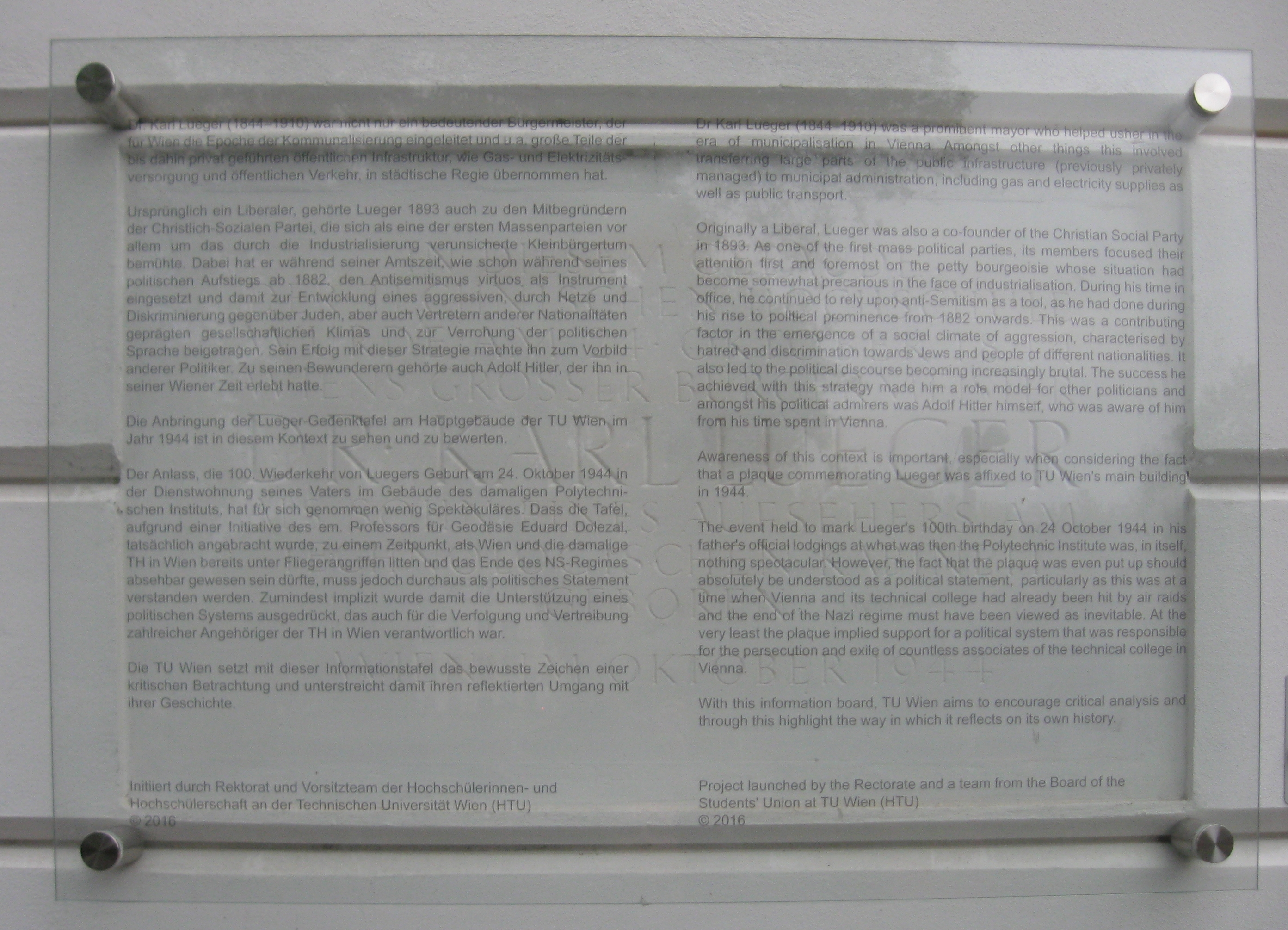
Lueger memorial plaque at TU Vienna

For some, the Lueger monuments show that Vienna has neglected its obligations to the victims of the Holocaust in order to keep its nostalgic appeal as the grand Imperial City. For example, when Austrian-born neurobiologist Eric Kandel won the Nobel Prize in 2000, he "stuck it to the Austrians" by saying it was certainly not an Austrian Nobel; it was a Jewish-American Nobel. He was subsequently telephoned by the Austrian president Thomas Klestil who asked him, "How can we put things right?" Kandel said that first, Dr.-Karl-Lueger-Ring should be renamed. Kandel was offended that the address of the University of Vienna is on that street. After yearlong debates, the Ring was renamed to Universitätsring in April 2012. The monument to Lueger at Dr. Karl Lueger Platz at the Stubenring as well as the memorial plaque at the TU Wien have since been contextualized by descriptions highlighting Lueger's antisemitism and his influence on National Socialism.

Lueger was the subject of a 1943 biopic Vienna 1910, in which he was played by Rudolf Forster.

== Honours ==
He received the following orders and decorations:

- Austria-Hungary: Grand Cross of the Order of Franz Joseph, 1907
- Kingdom of Bavaria: Grand Cross of the Merit Order of St. Michael
- Belgium: Grand Officer of the Order of Leopold, with Star
- France: Commander of the Legion of Honour
- Holy See:
  - Grand Cross of St. Gregory the Great
  - Cross of Honour "Pro Ecclesia et Pontifice"
- Ottoman Empire: Order of the Medjidie, 1st Class
- Persian Empire: Order of the Lion and the Sun, 2nd Class with Star
- Kingdom of Prussia: Knight of the Red Eagle, 1st Class in Diamonds
- Kingdom of Romania: Grand Cross of the Crown of Romania
- Russian Empire: Knight of St. Stanislaus, 2nd Class with Star
- Kingdom of Saxony: Commander of the Albert Order, 1st Class with Star
- Spain: Grand Cross of Isabella the Catholic, 19 October 1906
- Sweden-Norway: Commander Grand Cross of the Polar Star
- United Kingdom: Honorary Commander of the Royal Victorian Order, 9 October 1903

Preceded by Josef Strobach	Mayor of Vienna; 1897–1910	Succeeded by Josef Neumayer
