= Julia Lubomirska =

Polish noblewoman (1764–1794)

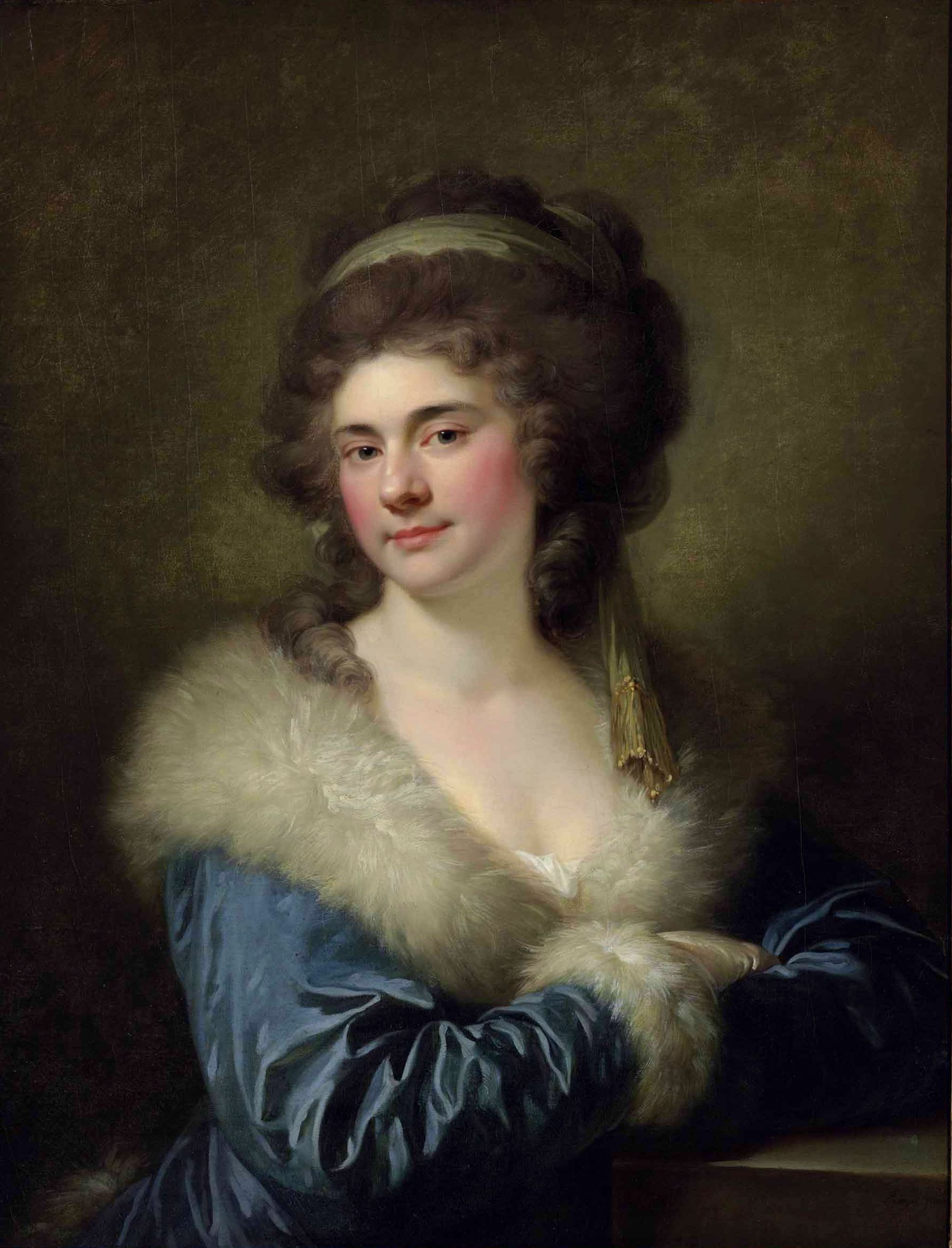
- Portrait by Johann Baptist von Lampi the Elder, c. 1789
- Coat of arms: Drużyna coat of arms
- Born: 1764
- Died: 22 August 1794 (aged 29–30); Kraków
- Family: Lubomirski
- Spouse: Jan Potocki
- Issue: Alfred Wojciech Potocki; Artur Potocki
- Father: Stanisław Lubomirski
- Mother: Elżbieta Czartoryska

Princess Julia Lubomirska (1764 – 22 August 1794) was a Polish noblewoman and a landowner, known for her love life.

== Biography ==
She was the daughter of Princess Izabela Czartoryska, one of the richest people in the Commonwealth and cousin of the king Stanislaus Augustus, and her husband, Prince Stanisław Lubomirski, the Grand Marshal of the Crown. She was considered one of the most beautiful Polish women of her time, for which she was called "Giulietta la bella".

In 1785, in Wilanów, she married Jan Nepomucen Potocki, travel writer best known for his novel The Manuscript Found in Saragossa and for being the first person in Poland to fly on a hot-air balloon. Soon after the wedding they went together to Italy, France, Britain, and the Netherlands for three years. During this time, she gave birth to Alfred and Artur while staying with her mother.

They returned in 1788, when Jan became an envoy at the Four-Year Sejm and Julia supported the Constitution of 3 May. It was during this time that she met Eustachy Erazm Sanguszko, also an envoy at said Sejm, with whom she had an affair well known socially. They were separated by his participation in the Polish–Russian War of 1792 and the Kościuszko Uprising, though they continued to correspond. Following the triumph of Russia over the Constitution and the accession of the king to the Targowica Confederation, Julia and her husband returned to France, where he had links with the Jacobins. While there, she provided Tadeusz Kościuszko with organisational and financial help in January 1793. After this, Jan went to Germany while Julia returned to Poland.

== Death ==
She died of tuberculosis, with her husband and two sons by her deathbed. Through her son Alfred Wojciech Potocki and his daughter the current royal family of Liechtenstein are her descendants.

== See also ==
- Biała Dama
