= Artur Potocki =

Polish noble (1787–1832)

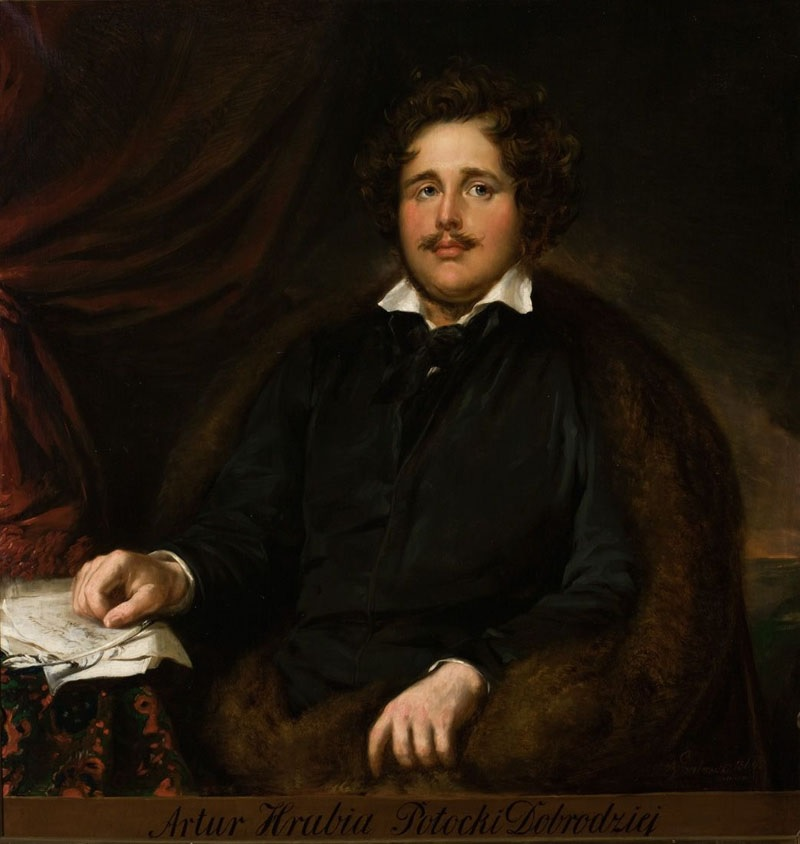
- Coat of arms: Piława
- Born: 27 May 1787; Paris, France
- Died: 30 January 1832 (aged 44); Vienna, Austria
- Noble family: Potocki
- Spouse: Zofia Branicka
- Issue: Adam Józef Potocki; Aleksandra (1818–1819); Maria (1819–1822); Alfred (1820–1821)
- Father: Jan Potocki
- Mother: Julia Lubomirska

Artur Stanisław Potocki (1787–1832) was a Polish nobleman (szlachcic).

== Biography ==
He was the son of Julia Lubomirska and Jan Potocki, the travel writer best known for his novel Manuscript found in Saragossa. Artur was the owner of Krzeszowice and Łańcut estates. He became officer in the Polish Army and aide-de-camp of Prince Józef Poniatowski. He was married to Zofia Branicka, since 1816.

He died on 30 January in Vienna and was buried on 27 May 1832 in the Potocki Chapel in the Wawel Cathedral, Kraków.

== Awards ==
- Virtuti Militari
- Légion d'honneur

== Sources ==
- Wawrzyniec Siek (Ed.), Opis historyczny parafii i miasta Staszów do 1918 r., Staszów, 1990 Parafia Rzymsko-Katolicka
- Aldona Cholewianka-Kruszyńska: Wychowanie dzieci – braci Alfreda i Artura Potockich w Łańcucie...
