= Zofia Branicka =

Polish noblewoman and art collector

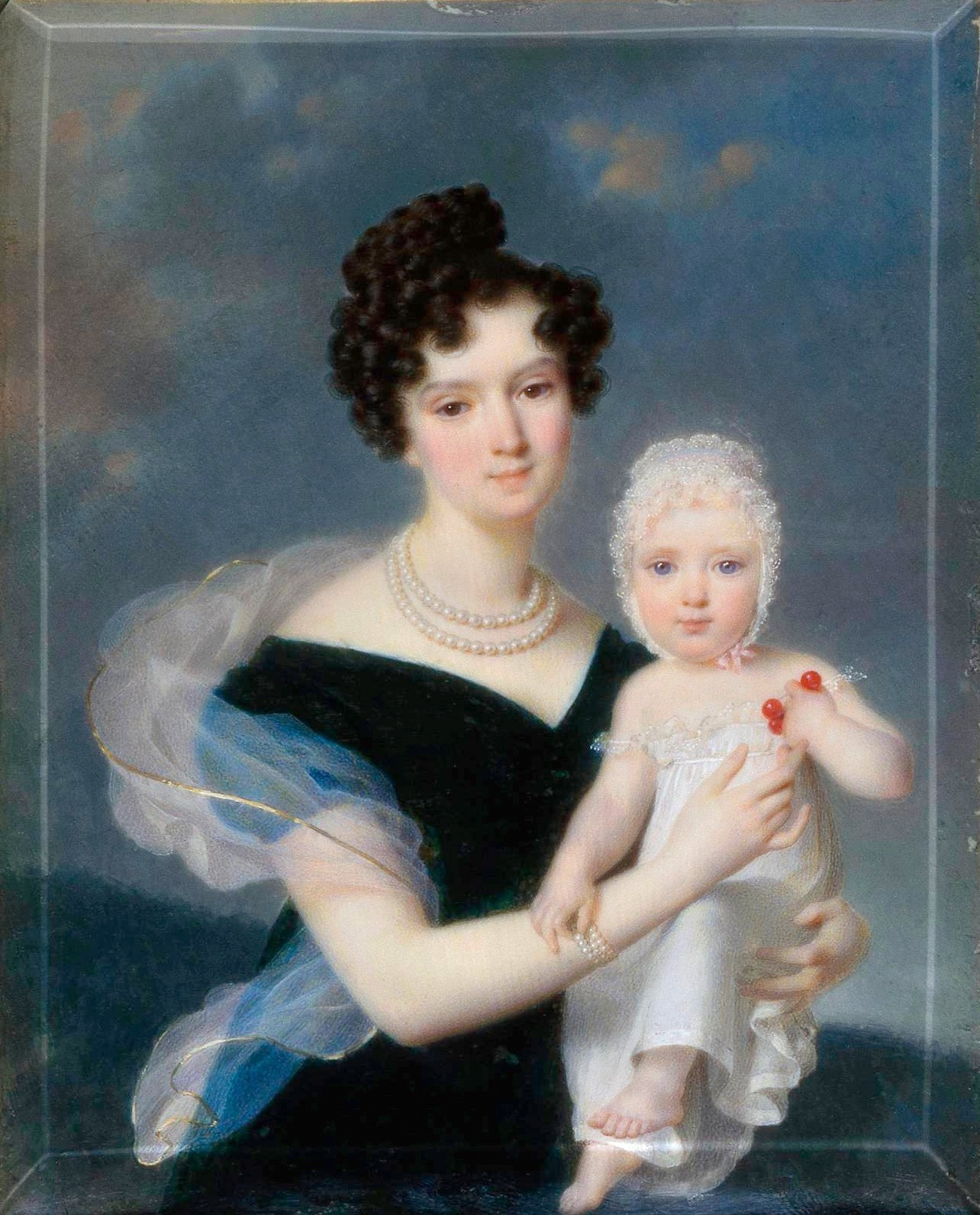
- Portrait of Branicka, 1820
- Coat of arms: Korczak
- Born: 11 January 1790; Warsaw, Poland
- Died: 6 January 1879 (aged 88); Krzeszowice, Poland
- Noble family: Branicki
- Spouse: Artur Potocki
- Issue: Adam Józef Potocki (1822–72); Aleksandra (1818–19); Maria (1819–22); Alfred (1820–21)
- Father: Franciszek Ksawery Branicki
- Mother: Aleksandra von Engelbrandt

Countess Zofia Branicka (11 January 1790– 6 January 1879) was a Polish noble woman and art collector.

She was the daughter of Franciszek Ksawery Branicki, one of the leaders of the Targowica Confederation, and Aleksandra von Engelhardt, the niece of Grigory Potemkin. In 1816, she married Artur Potocki.

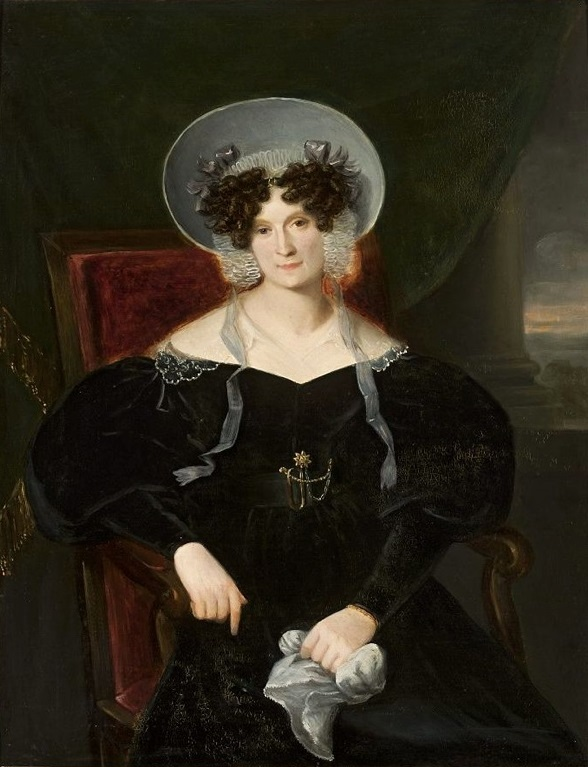
Zofia Branicka
