= Jan Potocki =

Polish nobleman, writer (creating in French), traveler, politician and historian

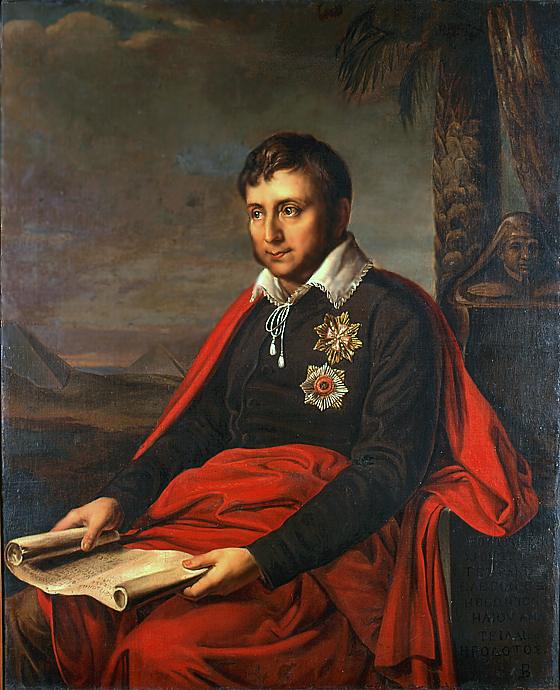
- Jan Potocki by Alexander Varnek
- Born: 8 March 1761; Pików, Podolia, Polish–Lithuanian Commonwealth
- Died: 23 December 1815 (aged 54); Uladivka, Vinnytsia, Russian Empire
- Occupations: Novelist; ethnologist; politician
- Era: Enlightenment; Romanticism
- Known for: The Manuscript Found in Saragossa (1805)
- Spouses: Julia Lubomirska (m. 1783; died 1794) Konstancja Potocka (m. 1799)
- Children: 5, including Alfred and Artur
- Parents: Józef Potocki (father); Anna Teresa Ossolińska (mother)

Count Jan Potocki (Polish pronunciation: [ˈjan pɔˈtɔt͡skʲi]; 8 March 1761 – 23 December 1815) was a Polish nobleman, ethnologist, linguist, traveller and author of the Enlightenment period, whose life and exploits made him a celebrated figure in Poland. He is known chiefly for his picaresque novel, The Manuscript Found in Saragossa.

Born into affluent Polish nobility, Potocki lived abroad from an early age and was primarily educated in Switzerland. He frequently visited the salons of Paris and toured Europe before temporarily returning to Poland in 1778. As a soldier, he fought in Austrian ranks in the War of the Bavarian Succession, and in 1789 was appointed a military engineer in the Polish army. During his extensive voyages he actively documented prevailing customs, ongoing wars, revolutions and national awakenings, which made him a pioneer of travel literature. Fascinated by the occult, Potocki studied ancient cultures, rituals and secret societies. Simultaneously, he was a member of parliament and took part in the Great Sejm shortly before the Polish–Lithuanian Commonwealth ceased to exist.

In spite of his literary career, Count Potocki became burdened by mental illness and melancholy. He committed suicide by gunshot in 1815; however, the circumstances of his death remain controversial to this day.

== Life ==
Jan Potocki was born into the Potocki aristocratic family, that owned vast estates across Poland. He was educated in Geneva and Lausanne, served twice in the Polish Army as a captain of engineers, and spent some time on a galley as novice to the Knights of Malta. His colorful life took him across Europe, Asia and North Africa, where he embroiled himself in political intrigues, flirted with secret societies and contributed to the birth of ethnology – he was one of the first to study the precursors of the Slavic peoples from a linguistic and historical standpoint.

In 1790 he became the first person in Poland to fly in a hot air balloon when he made an ascent over Warsaw with the aeronaut Jean-Pierre Blanchard, an exploit that earned him great public acclaim. He spent some time in France, and upon his return to Poland, he became a known publicist, publishing newspapers and pamphlets, in which he argued for various reforms. He also established in 1788 in Warsaw a publishing house named Drukarnia Wolna (Free Press) as well as the city's first free reading room. His relation with Stanislaus Augustus was thorny, as Potocki, while often supportive of the king, on occasion did not shy from his critique. He was also highly critical of the Russian ambassador, Otto Magnus von Stackelberg.

Potocki's wealth enabled him to travel extensively about Europe, the Mediterranean and Asia, visiting Italy, Sicily, Malta, the Netherlands, Germany, France, England, Russia, Turkey, Dalmatia, the Balkans, the Caucasus, Spain, Tunisia, Morocco, Egypt, and even Mongolia. He was also one of the first travel writers of the modern era, penning lively accounts of many of his journeys, during which he also undertook extensive historical, linguistic, and ethnographic studies.

Potocki married twice and had five children. His first marriage, to Julia Lubomirska, ended in divorce, and both marriages were the subject of scandalous rumors. In 1812, disillusioned and in poor health, he retired to his estate at Uładówka (now Uladivka) near Vinnytsia (known as Winnica in Polish) in Podolia in present-day Ukraine, suffering from "melancholia" (which today would probably be diagnosed as depression), and during the last few years of his life he completed his novel.

== The Manuscript Found in Saragossa ==
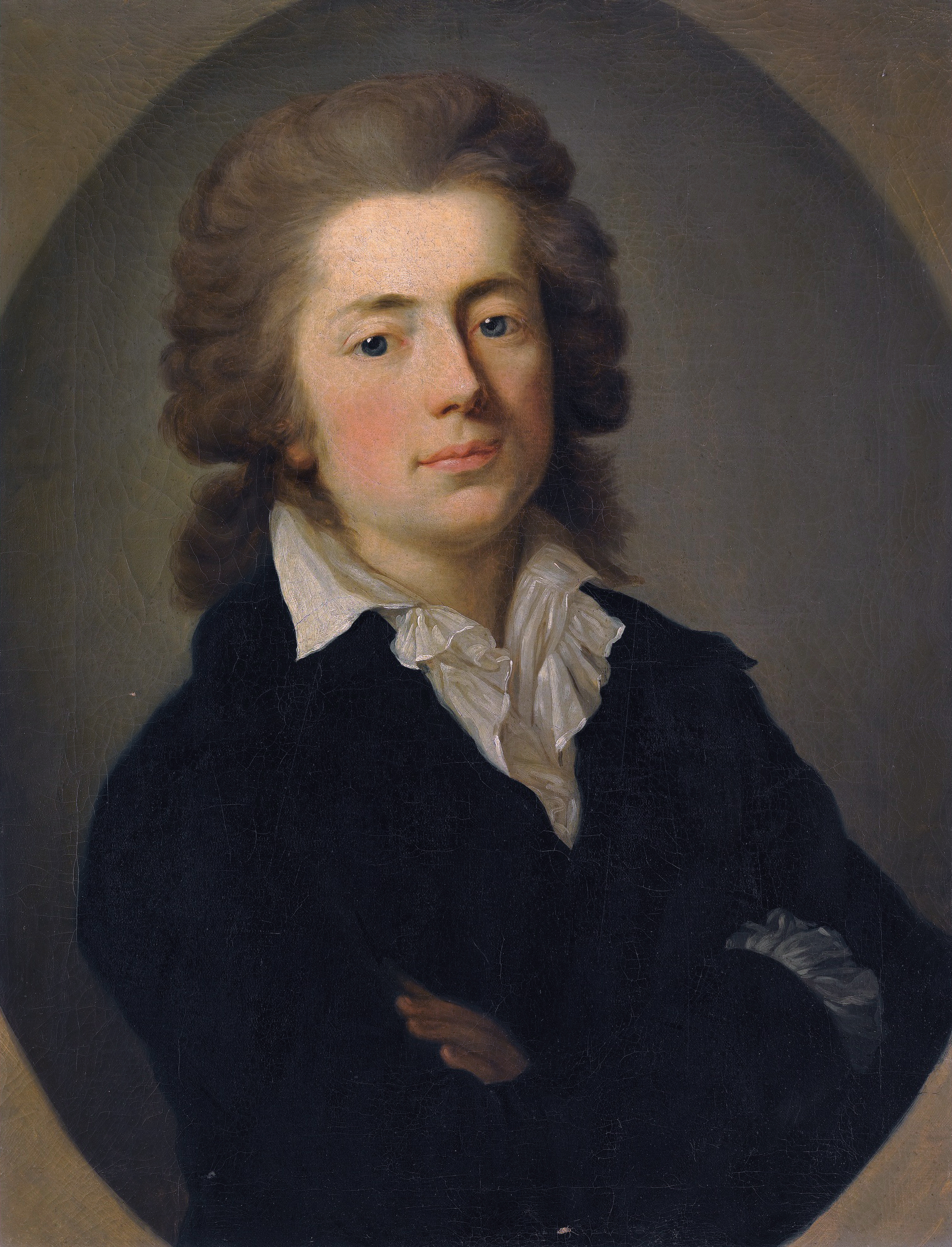
Jan Potocki, by Anton Graff, 1785

Potocki's most famous work, originally written in French, is The Manuscript Found in Saragossa (Manuscrit trouvé à Saragosse). It is a frame tale. On account of its rich, interlocking structure, and telescoping story sequences, the novel has drawn comparisons to such celebrated works as the Decameron and the Arabian Nights.

The book's title is explained in the foreword, which is narrated by an unnamed French officer who describes his fortuitous discovery of an intriguing Spanish manuscript during the sack of Zaragoza in 1809, in the course of the Napoleonic Wars. Soon after, the French officer is captured by the Spanish and stripped of his possessions; but a Spanish officer recognizes the manuscript's importance, and during the French officer's captivity the Spaniard translates it for him into French.

The manuscript has been written by a young officer of the Walloon Guards, Alphonse van Worden. In 1739, while en route to Madrid to serve with the Spanish Army, he is diverted into Spain's rugged Sierra Morena region. There, over a period of sixty-six days, he encounters a varied group of characters, including Muslim princesses, Gypsies, outlaws, and kabbalists, who tell him an intertwining series of bizarre, amusing, and fantastic tales which he records in his diary.

The sixty-six stories cover a wide range of themes, subjects, and styles, including gothic horror, picaresque adventures, and comic, erotic, and moral tales. The stories reflect Potocki's interest in secret societies, the supernatural, and oriental cultures, and they are illustrated with his detailed observations of 18th-century European manners and customs, particularly those of upper-class Spanish society.

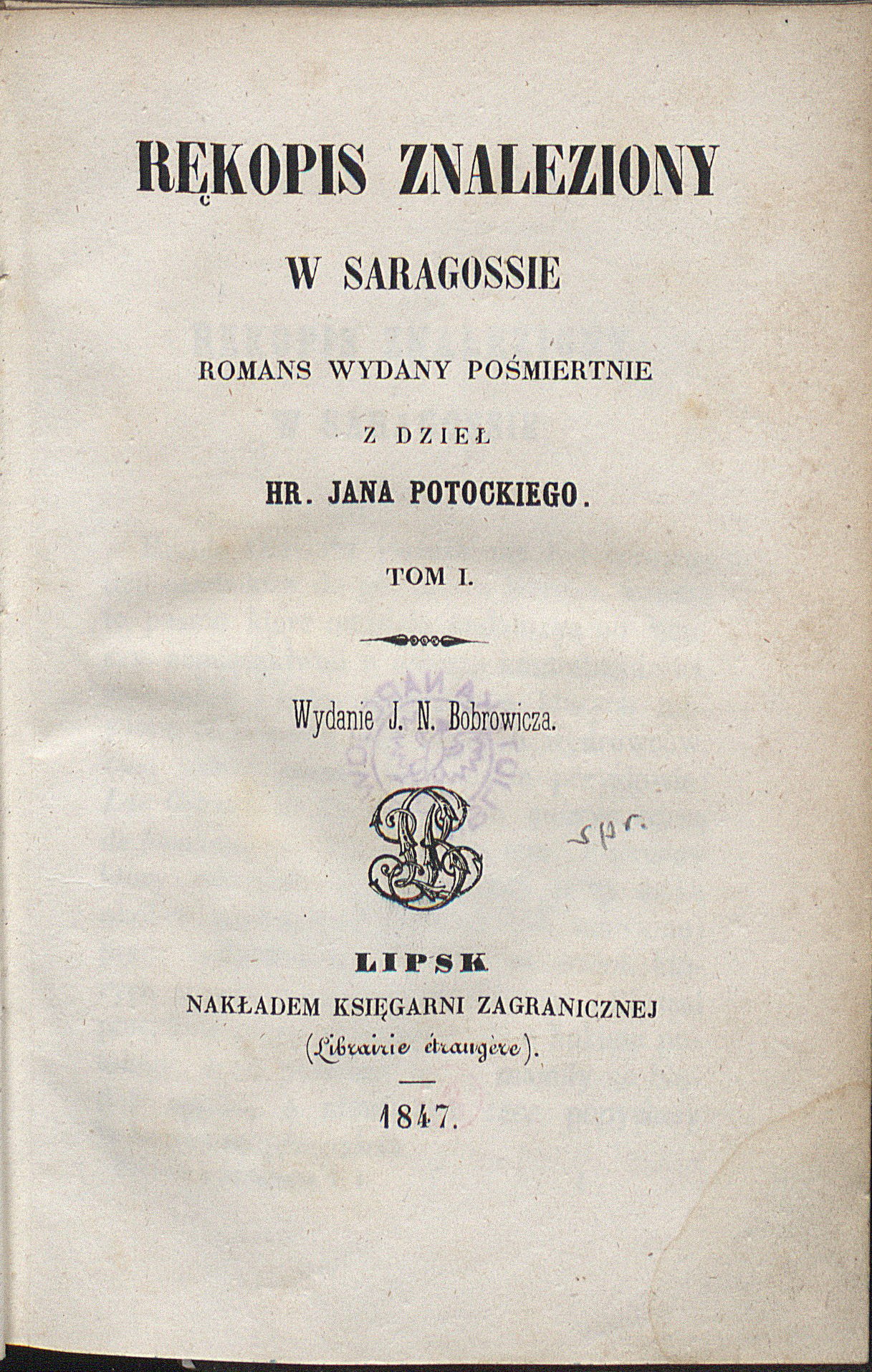
Title page of The Manuscript Found in Saragossa, first Polish edition, 1847

Many of the locations described in the tales are real places and regions which Potocki would have visited during his travels, while others are fictionalized accounts of actual places.

While there is still some dispute about the novel's authorship, it is now generally accepted to have indeed been written by Potocki. He began writing it in the 1790s and completed it in 1814, a year before his death, though the novel's structure is thought to have been fully mapped out by 1805.

The novel was never published in its entirety during Potocki's lifetime. A proof edition of the first ten "days" was circulated in Saint Petersburg in 1805, and a second extract was published in Paris in 1813, almost certainly with Potocki's permission. A third publication, combining both earlier extracts, was issued in 1814, but it appears that at the time of his death Potocki had not yet decided on the novel's final form.

Potocki composed the book entirely in the French language. Sections of the original manuscripts were later lost, but have survived in a Polish translation that was made in 1847 by Edmund Chojecki from a complete French copy, now lost.

The most recent and complete French-language version, edited by François Rosset and Dominique Triaire, was published in 2006 in Leuven, Belgium, as part of a critical scholarly edition of the complete works of Potocki. Unlike Radrizzani's 1989 edition of the Manuscript Found in Saragossa, Rosset and Triaire's edition has been based solely on Potocki's French-language manuscripts found in several libraries in France, Poland (in particular, previously unknown autograph pieces that they discovered in Poznań), Spain, and Russia, as well as in the private collection of Potocki's heirs. They identified two versions of the novel: one unfinished, of 1804, published in 1805, and the full version of 1810, which appears to have been completely reconceived in comparison to the 1804 version. Whereas the first version has a lighter, more sceptical tone, the second one tends towards a darker, more religious mood. In view of the differences between the two versions, the 1804 and 1810 versions have been published as two separate books; paperback editions were issued in early 2008 by Flammarion.

The first English-language edition, published in 1995, was a translation of Radrizzani's edition by Oxford scholar Ian MacLean. Potocki's novel became more widely known thanks to the stylish black-and-white 1965 film adaptation directed by renowned filmmaker Wojciech Has and starring Zbigniew Cybulski as Alphonse van Worden.

== Travel memoirs ==
- Histoire Primitive des Peuples de la Russie avec une Exposition complete de Toutes les Nations, locales, nationales et traditionelles, necessaires a l'intelligence du quatrieme livre d'Herodote (St. Petersbourg: Imprime a l'Academie Imperiale des Sciences, 1802)
- Histoire anciènne des provinces de l'Empire de Russie (St. Petersburg, 1804)
- Voyage dans les steppes d'Astrakhan et du Caucase (Paris, 1829).
- Voyage en Turquie et en Egypte (1788; Polish translation by Julian Ursyn Niemcewicz, Podróz do Turek i Egiptu, 1789).
- Voyage dans l'Empire de Maroc (1792)
- Voyage Dans Quelques Parties De La Basse-Saxe (1795)
- Voyage en Hollande, fait pendant la révolution de 1787

Modern editions have appeared as follows:

- Voyages en Turquie et en Egypte, en Hollande, au Maroc (Paris: Fayard, 1980; new edition, Éditions Phébus, 1991)
- Voyage au Caucase et en Chine (Paris: Fayard, 1980)

== Honours and awards ==
- Order of the White Eagle
- Order of Saint Stanislaus, 1st Class
- Order of St. Vladimir, 1st Class

== See also ==
- Back-translation of The Saragossa Manuscript
- List of Egyptologists
- List of Poles
- Polish literature

== Notes and references ==
- Ian MacLean, introduction to The Manuscript Found in Saragossa, London, Penguin Books, 1995
