= Ivano-Frankivsk =

City in Ivano-Frankivsk Oblast, Ukraine

Ivano-Frankivsk Івано-Франківськ
- City
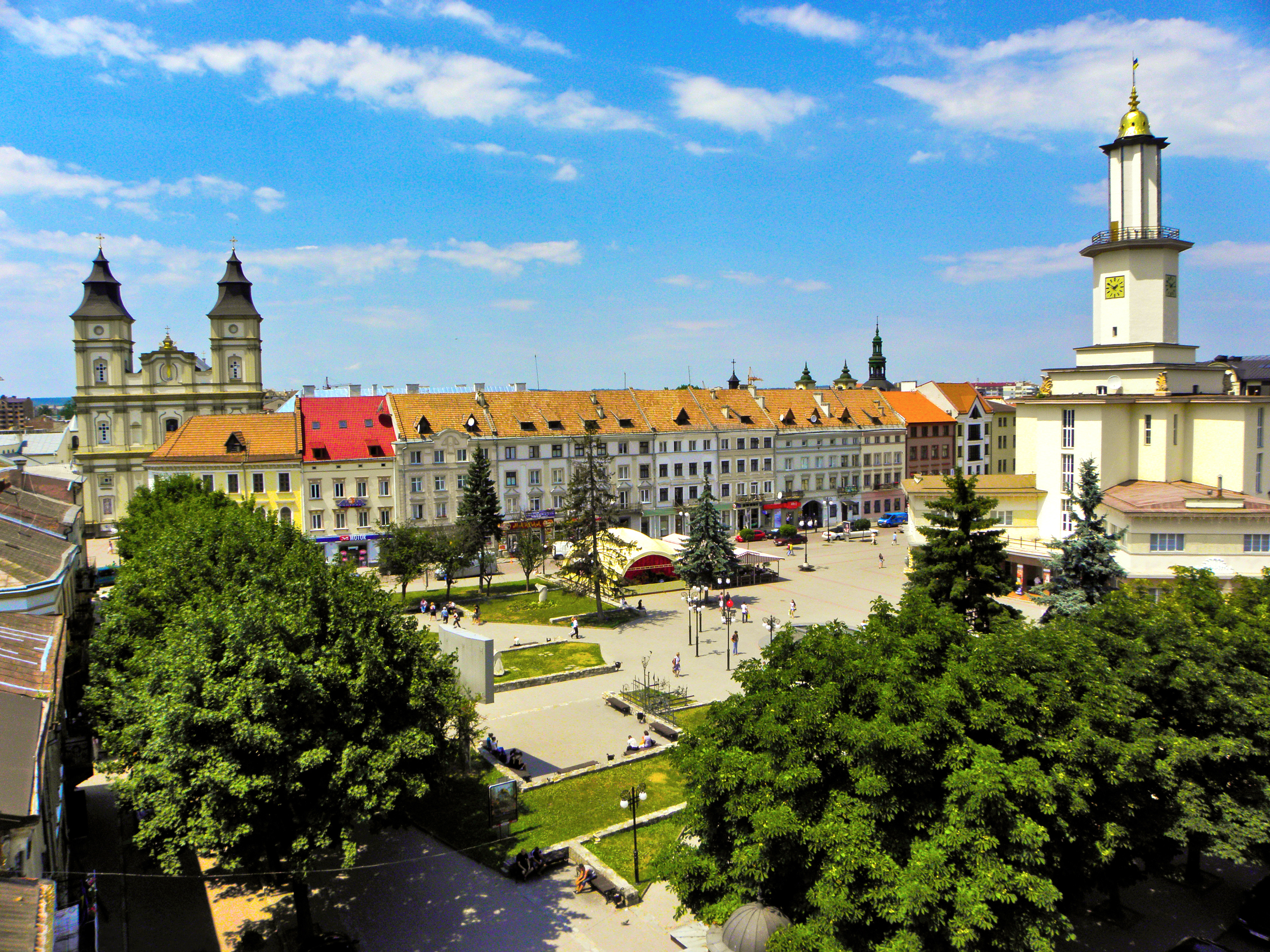
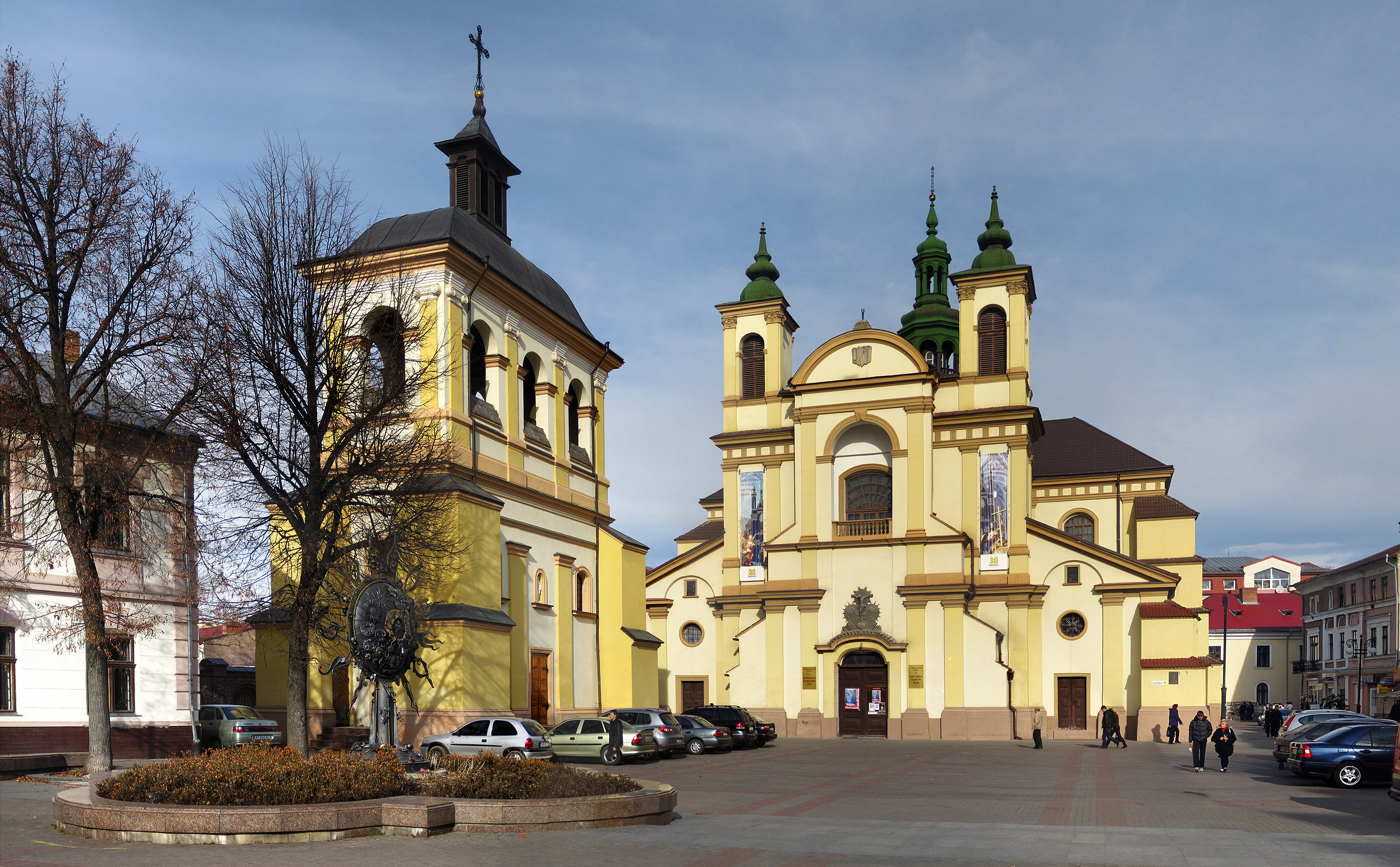
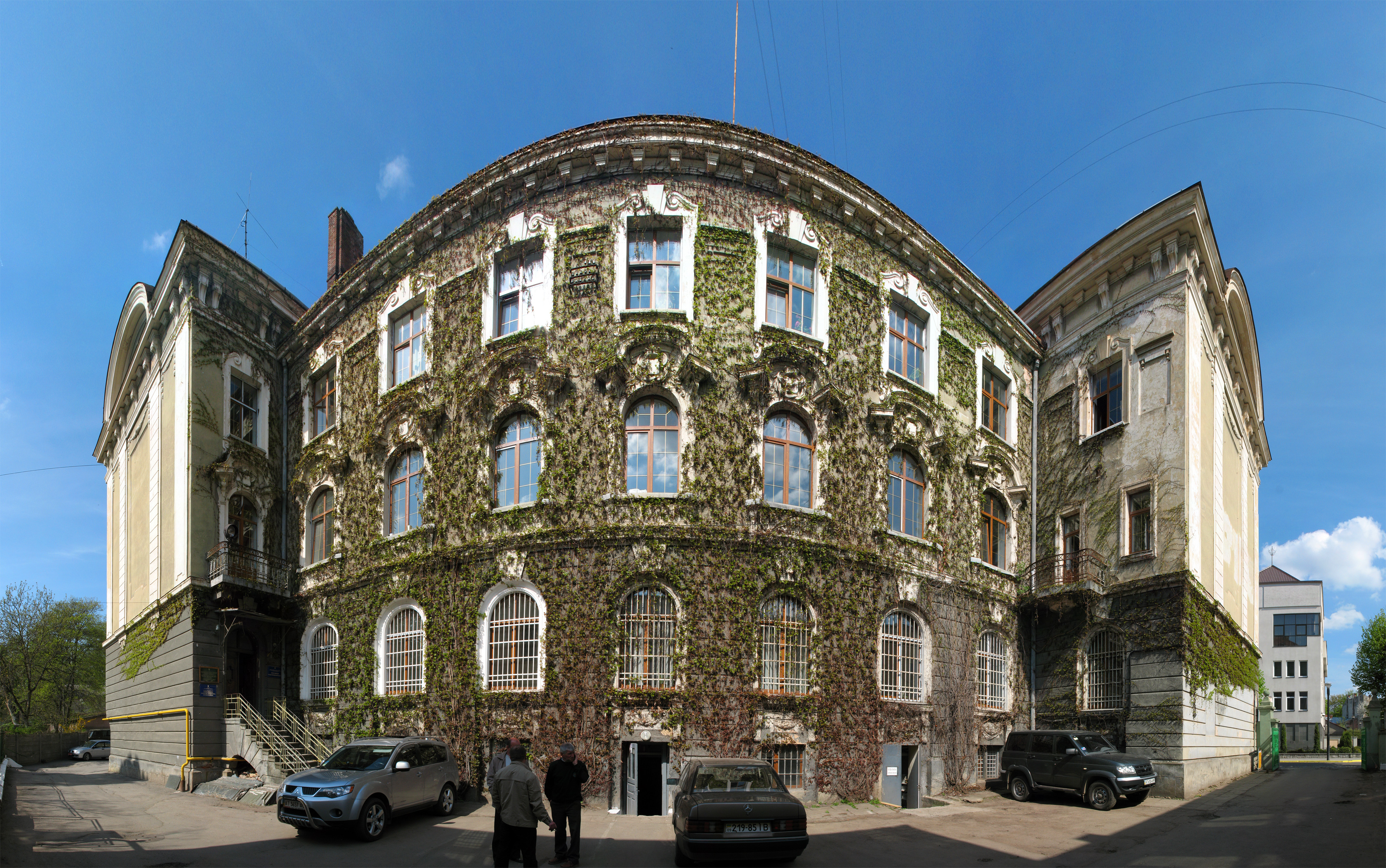
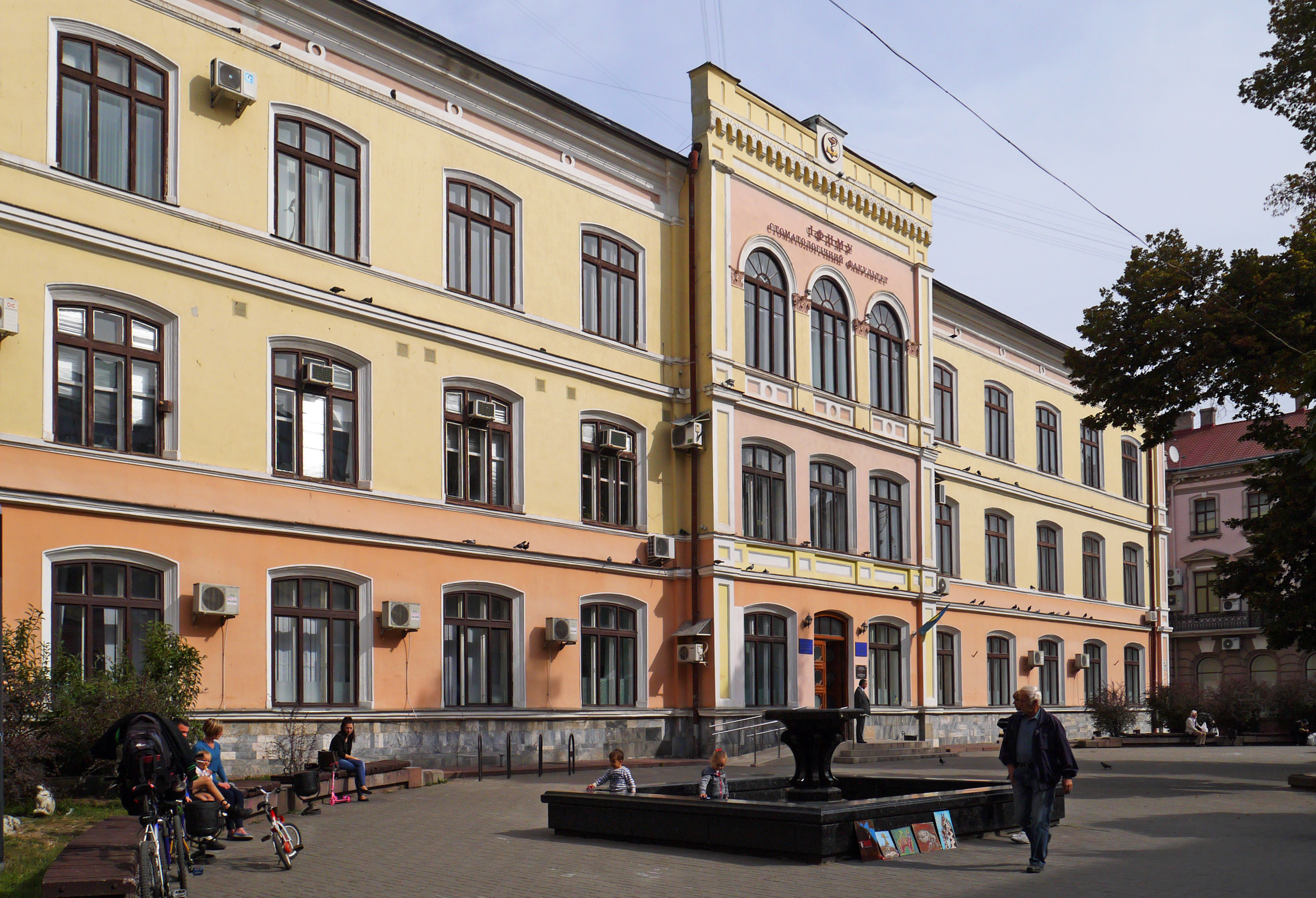
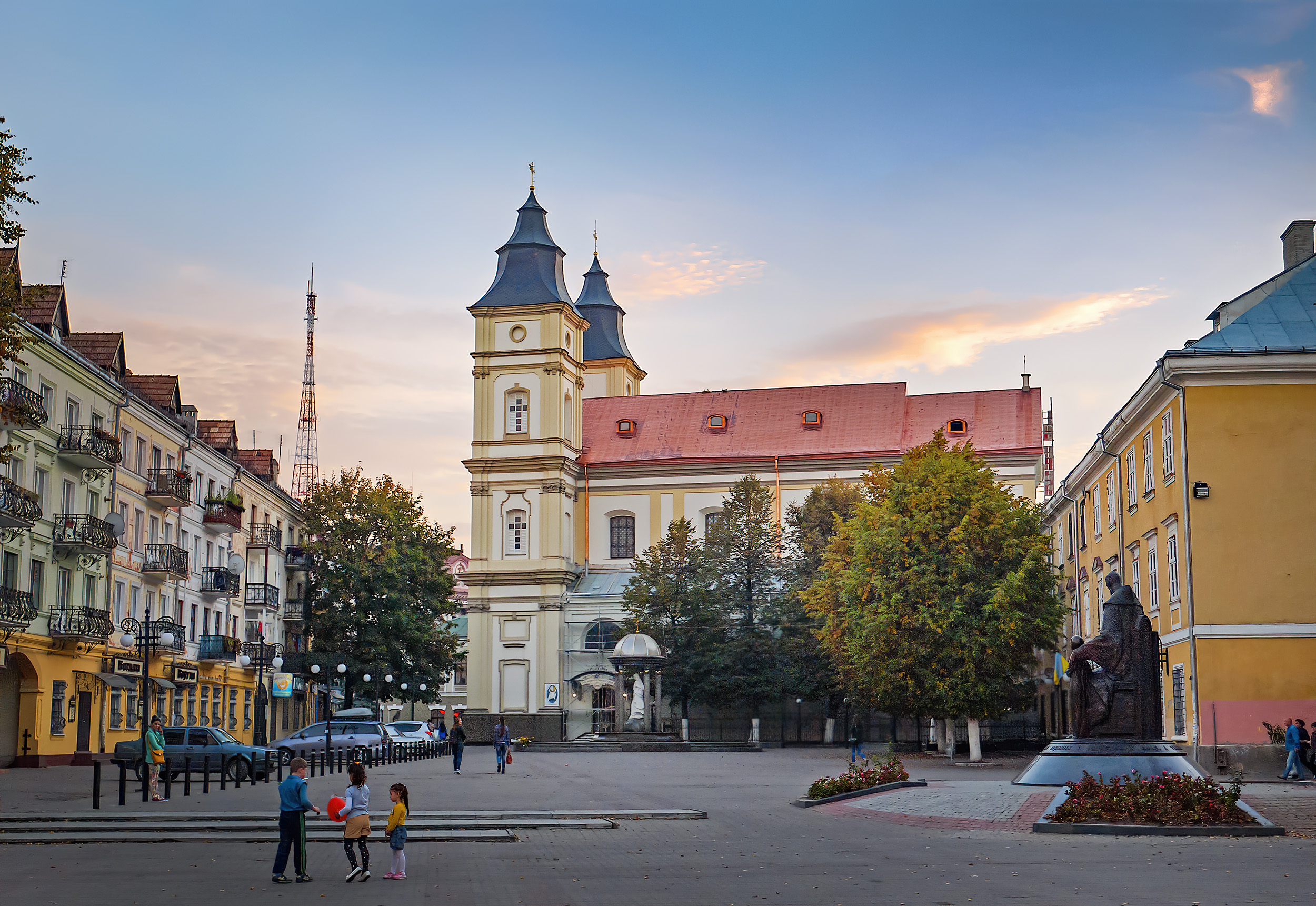
- Market Square Church of Virgin Mary Forestry National Medical University Cathedral of the Resurrection of Christ

- Flag Coat of arms
- Nicknames: Frankivsk (Франківськ), Franyk (Франик)
- Location of Ivano-Frankivsk Ivano-Frankivsk (Ukraine)
- Coordinates: 48°55′22″N 24°42′38″E
- Country: Ukraine
- Oblast: Ivano-Frankivsk Oblast
- Raion: Ivano-Frankivsk Raion
- Hromada: Ivano-Frankivsk urban hromada
- Established: 1662
- Named for: Ivan Franko

Government
  - Mayor: Ruslan Martsinkiv (Svoboda)

Area
  - Total: 83.7 km^{2} (32.3 sq mi)
- Elevation: 260 m (850 ft)

Population (2022)
  - Total: 238,196
  - Density: 2,850/km^{2} (7,370/sq mi)
- Time zone: UTC+2 (EET)
  - Summer (DST): UTC+3 (EEST)
- Postal code: 76000–76030
- Area code: +380 342
- Website: mvk.if.ua

Ivano-Frankivsk (Ukrainian: Івано-Франківськ, IPA: [iˈwɑno frɐnˈkiu̯sʲk]), formerly Stanyslaviv, Stanislav and Stanisławów, (Note: Ukrainian: Станиславів/Станіслав; Polish: Stanisławów [staɲiˈswavuf]; German: Stanislau.) is a city in western Ukraine. It serves as the administrative centre of Ivano-Frankivsk Oblast as well as Ivano-Frankivsk Raion within the oblast. Ivano-Frankivsk also hosts the administration of the Ivano-Frankivsk urban hromada. Its population is 238,196 (2022 estimate), 227,827 (2024 estimate).

Built in the mid-17th century as a fortress of the Polish Potocki family, Stanisławów was annexed to the Habsburg Empire during the First Partition of Poland in 1772, after which it became the property of the State within the Austrian Empire. Throughout this time, it was within the Kingdom of Galicia and Lodomeria. The fortress was slowly transformed into one of the most prominent cities at the foothills of the Carpathian Mountains. After World War I, for several months, it served as a temporary capital of the West Ukrainian People's Republic. Following the Peace of Riga in 1921, Stanisławów became part of the Second Polish Republic. After the Soviet invasion of Poland at the onset of World War II, the city was annexed by the Soviet Union, only to be occupied by Nazi Germany two years later. With the liberation of Soviet Ukraine in 1944 and the shifting of borders, the city remained part of the Ukrainian SSR and was renamed in 1962 after Ivan Franko. With the fall of the Soviet Union in 1991, the city became part of newly-independent Ukraine.

Ivano-Frankivsk is one of the principal cities of the Carpathian Euroregion. There are elements of various cultures intertwined in the city's architecture, including the Polish city hall, the Austro-Hungarian city's business centre, the Soviet prefabricated apartment blocks at the city's rural–urban fringe, and others.

== Name ==
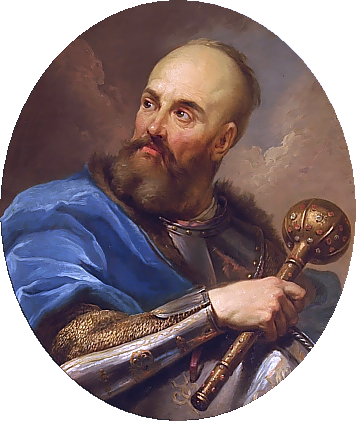
Stanisław "Rewera" Potocki after whom the city was named originally.

The town was founded as a fortress known as Stanisławów where it was named after the Polish hetman Stanisław "Rewera" Potocki. Some sources claim it was named after his grandson Stanisław. Following the First Partition of Poland in 1772, the name was transliterated as Stanislau in German, as the city became part of the Austrian Empire, and later Austria-Hungary; however, after the Revolutions of 1848, the city carried three different linguistic renderings of its name: German, Polish, and Ruthenian (German: Stanislau, pronounced [ˈʃtaːnɪslaʊ]; Polish: Stanisławów, pronounced [staɲiˈswavuf]; Ukrainian: Станісла́вів Stanislaviv, pronounced [stɐn⁽ʲ⁾iˈslɑwiu̯], or Станиславiв Stanyslaviv, pronounced [stɐnɪˈslɑwiu̯]). Other spellings used in the local press media included Russian: Станиславов Stanislavov and Yiddish: סטאַניסלאוו.

After World War II it was changed by the Soviet authorities into a simplified version Stanislav (Ukrainian: Станісла́в, pronounced [stɐn⁽ʲ⁾iˈslɑu̯]; Russian: Станисла́в, pronounced [stənʲɪˈslaf]). In 1962, to honor the Ukrainian writer Ivan Franko on the city's 300th anniversary, it was renamed Ivano-Frankivsk (Ukrainian: Івано-Франківськ) or Ivano-Frankovsk (Russian: Ивано-Франковск). It is sometimes colloquially called Frankivsk Франківськ. In several languages two names can be found in 21st century sources: one ending in /ivsk/ and one in /ovsk/. In English the city is "also known as" Ivano-Frankovsk. Poland clarified in 2010 that Iwano-Frankiwsk should be used instead of Iwano-Frankowsk.

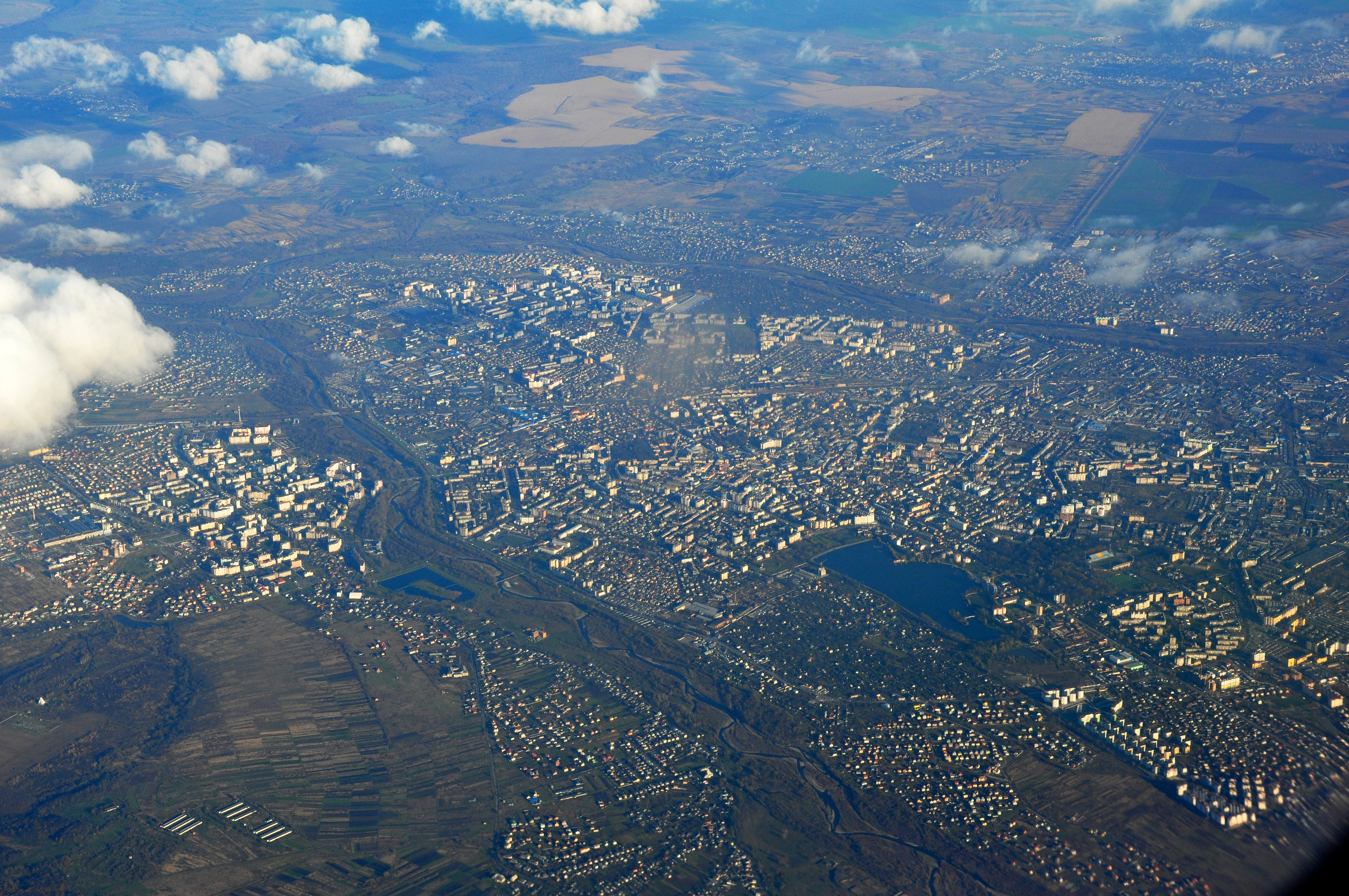
Aerial view of Ivano-Frankivsk

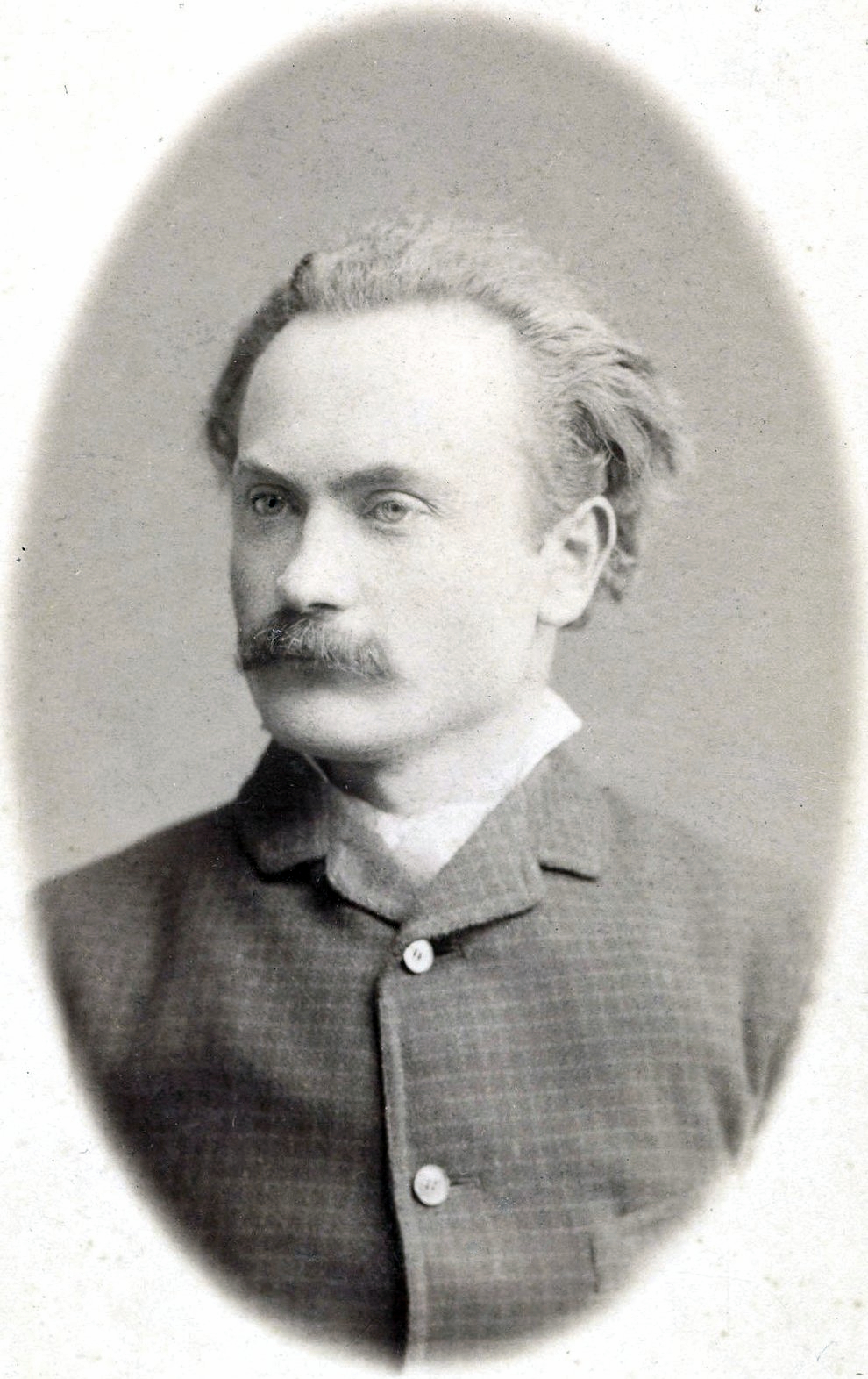
Ukrainian writer Ivan Franko

== History ==
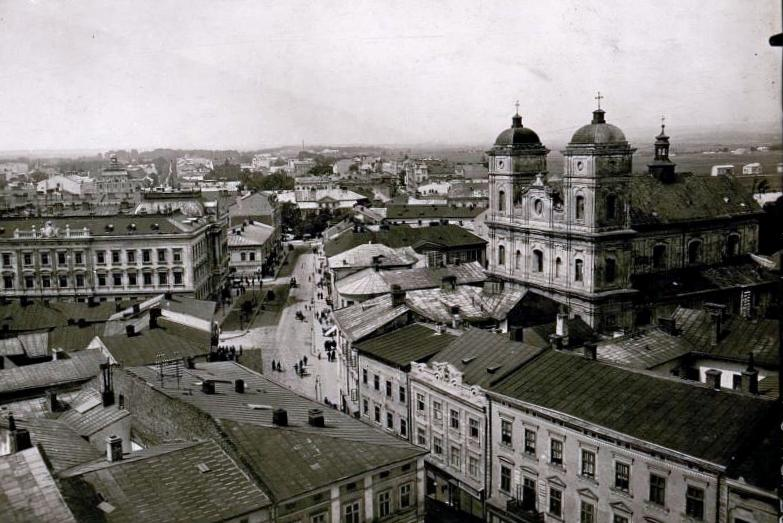
Ivano-Frankivsk in 1915.

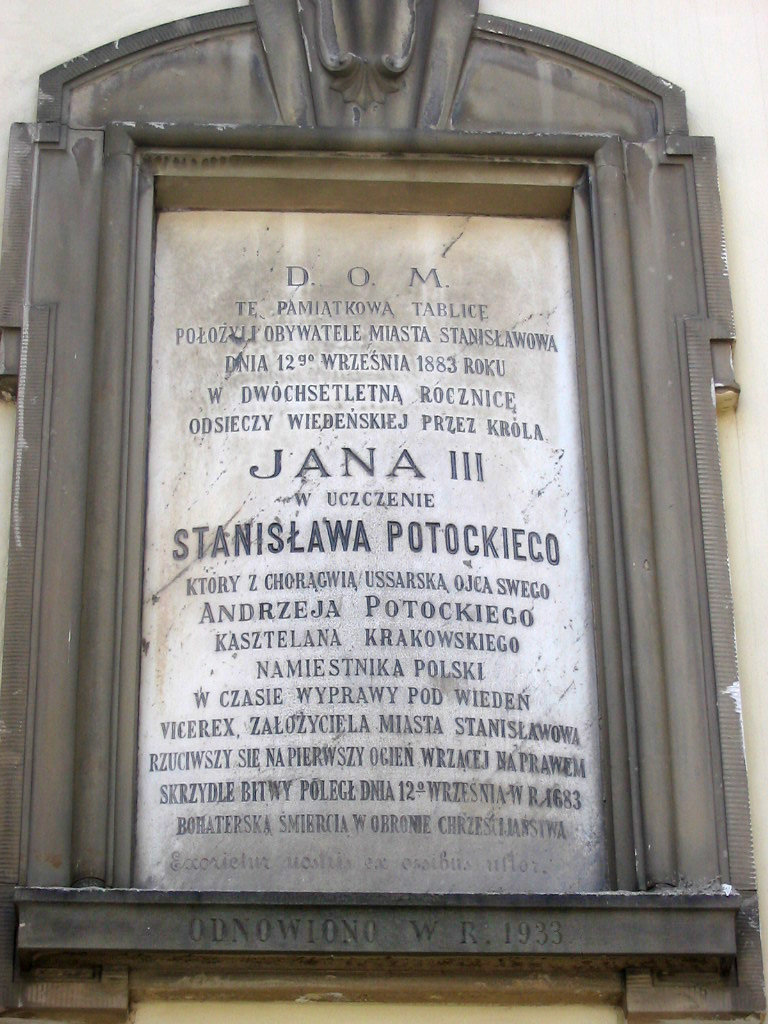
Memorial plaque at the Regional Art Museum about the death of Stanislaw Potocki, son of Andrzej.

The town of Stanisławów was founded as a fortress in order to protect the Polish–Lithuanian Commonwealth from Tatar invasions and to defend the multi-ethnic population of the region in case of armed conflicts such as the Khmelnytsky Uprising of 1648. The fort was originally built next to Zabolotiv village (known since 1435), and Knyahynyn (1449). The village of Zabolotiv and the land around it were purchased by Andrzej Potocki from another Polish nobleman, Rzeczkowski. Stanisławów was issued by Potocki and his declaration establishing the city with Magdeburg rights on 7 May 1662; but the city and its rights, however, were not recognized by the Polish Crown until 14 August 1663, when John Casimir had finally approved it. By 1672, the fortress had been rebuilt from wood to stone, brick, and mortar. Also a new large fortified Potocki palace was erected in the place of an older wood structure. Today this building serves as the military hospital. In the same year Jews were granted the right to become permanent residents, who could work, conduct commerce and travel in and out of the city as they pleased.

Originally the city was divided into two districts: Tysmenytsia and Halych. Sometime in 1817–1819 the neighbouring village of Zabolottya, that had a special status, was incorporated into the city as a new district, while Tysmenytsia district was divided into Tysmenytsia and Lysets districts. Each district had its main street corresponded with its name: Halych Street (Halych district), Tysmenytsia Street which today is Independence Street (Tysmenytsia district), Zabolotiv Street – Mykhailo Hrushevsky Street and Street of Vasylyanok (Zabolottya district), and Lysets Street – Hetman Mazepa Street (Lysets district). Later the city was split into six small districts: midtown where the rich Catholic population and patricians lived, pidzamche (subcastle), and four suburbs – Zabolotiv, Tysmenytsia, Halych and Lysets where the plebeians lived.

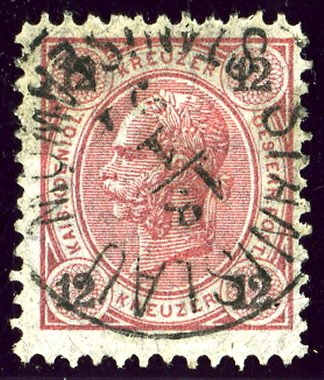
Austrian K.K. stamp bilingual cancelled in 1891 with German and Polish names.

In October 1918, the Austro-Hungarian Empire collapsed and the Western Ukrainian People's Republic (ZUNR) was proclaimed. In the early months of 1919 (from January to May) the city became a temporary capital of the West Ukrainian National Republic, while still recovering from World War I. All state affairs took place in the building of Dnister Hotel where the Act Zluky (Unification Act) was composed and signed on 22 January 1919 by the Ukrainian People's Republic. The same year it was subjected to the Polish–Ukrainian and the Romanian-Ukrainian skirmishes eventually being annexed by Poland as part of the Second Polish Republic as the centre of the Stanisławów Voivodeship. It was occupied by the Romanian army for the summer months from 25 May to 21 August 1919. During the Polish–Soviet War in 1920, the Red Army took over the city for a brief period. After the Soviet retreat, Ukrainian troops loyal to Symon Petlura occupied the city for a few days. At this period of history the city was in complete disorder. It then became part of Poland until the start of World War II.

In the 1939 invasion of Poland by German and Soviet forces, the territory was captured by the Soviets in September 1939 and annexed to the Ukrainian SSR. Between September 1939 and June 1941, the Soviet regime ordered thousands of inhabitants of the city to leave their houses and move to Siberia, where most of them perished. Numerous people were taken out of the city prison and simply shot outside of the city when Soviet forces were leaving it in 1941. Ivano-Frankivsk was occupied by German forces from 2 July 1941 to 27 July 1944. There were more than 40,000 Jews in Stanisławów when it was occupied by the Nazis on 26 July 1941. The Stanisławów Ghetto was formed. During the occupation (1941–1944), more than 600 educated Poles and most of the city's Jewish population were murdered.

In early 1944, the city became part of the Soviet Union and was again renamed Stanislav. The Soviets forced most of the Polish population to leave the city, where most of them settled in the Recovered Territories. In 1962, the city was renamed Ivano-Frankivsk after the Ukrainian writer Ivan Franko.

During the post-war period, the city was part of the Carpathian Military District housing the 38th Army (70th Motor Rifle Division) that participated in Warsaw Pact invasion of Czechoslovakia.

Until 18 July 2020, Ivano-Frankivsk was incorporated as a city of oblast significance and the center of Ivano-Frankivsk Municipality. The municipality was abolished in July 2020 as part of the administrative reform of Ukraine, which reduced the number of raions of Ivano-Frankivsk Oblast to six. The area of Ivano-Frankivsk Municipality was merged into the newly established Ivano-Frankivsk Raion.

Since the Russian full-scale invasion of Ukraine, the city is often bombed by Russian forces. On 24 February and 11 March 2022, Ivano-Frankivsk was struck by Russian missiles during the 2022 Russian invasion of Ukraine.

=== Timeline ===
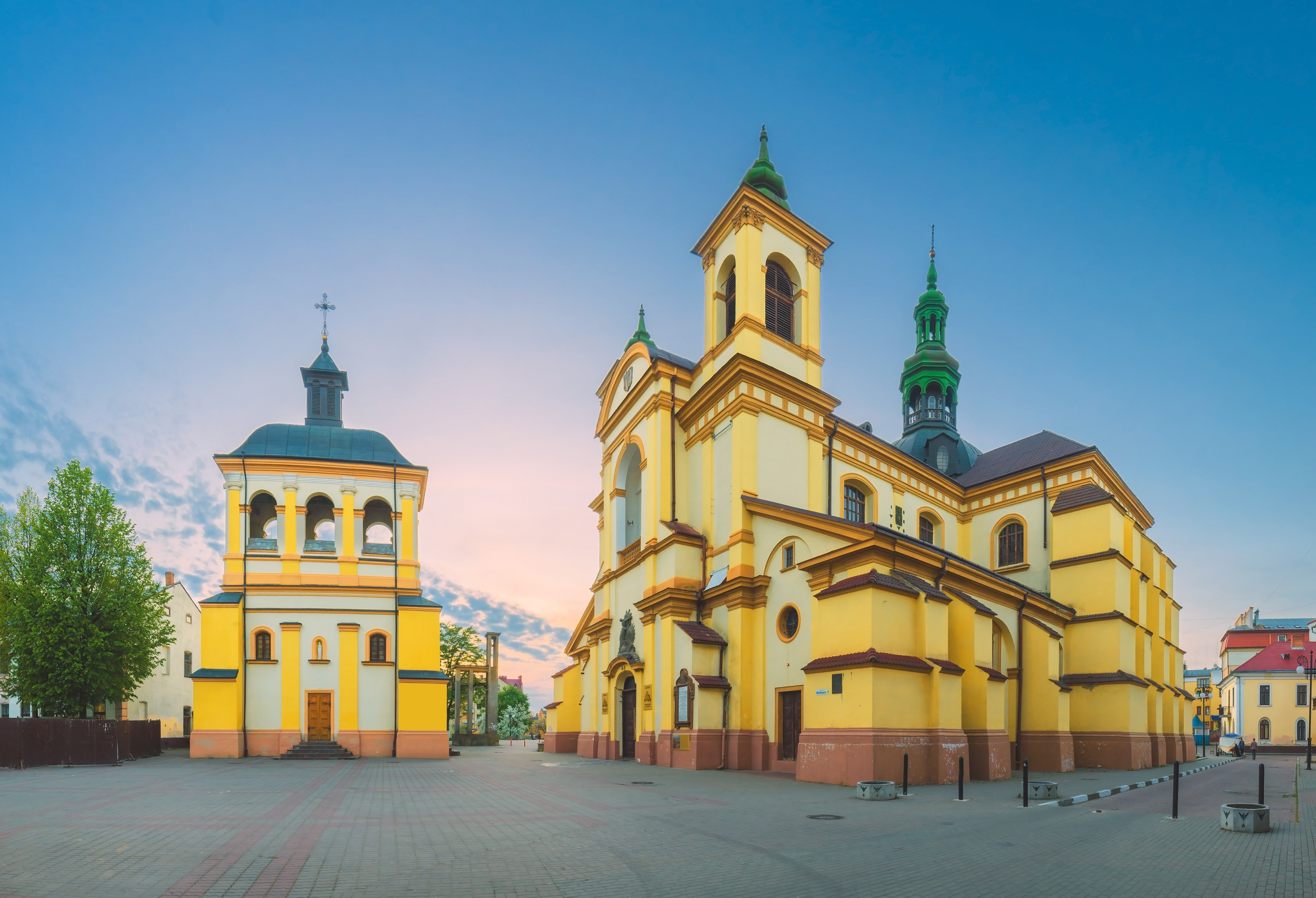
The city's Art Museum on Sheptytskyi Square (former Parish Church of Virgin Mary).

- 1650–1662: establishing a private fortress of Potocki
- 1662–1772: Stanisławów, Polish–Lithuanian Commonwealth (within the Kingdom of Poland),
- 1772–1815: Stanisławów (Stanislau), Austrian Monarchy (within the Kingdom of Galicia and Lodomeria),
- 1815–1918: Stanisławów (Stanislau), Austrian Empire, then Austria-Hungary,
- November 1918 – May 1919: Stanyslaviv, West Ukrainian People's Republic,
- May 1919 – September 1939: Stanisławów, Poland, seat of the Stanisławów Voivodeship,
- October 1939 – June 1941: Stanyslaviv, Ukrainian Soviet Socialist Republic,
- July 1941 – August 1944: Stanisławów (Stanislau), seat of the Stanislau Kreis, District of Galicia, General Government,
- August 1944 – 9 November 1962: Stanislav,
- 9 November 1962: renamed as Ivano-Frankivsk, oblast seat, Ukrainian SSR,
- 1991–present: Ivano-Frankivsk, independent Ukraine

== Geography ==
The city is situated in the Carpathian region northeast of the mountain range, sitting approximately 120 metres (390 ft) above mean sea level. One of the several main geographical features is the Vovchynets Hill also known as the Vovchynets Mountains. The hill reaches 300-350 metres (1,150 ft) above sea level and is part of the Pokuttya Highland (Upland). Around the hill Bystrytsia River branches into Bystrytsia of Nadvirna, Bystrytsia of Solotvyn, and Vorona. The last two rivers serve as a natural border between the Pokuttya Highland and Stanislav Basin. The Vovchynets Hill is located just outside and northeast of Ivano-Frankivsk. Located southeast from the Stanislav Basin in the direction of the Prut Valley is the Khorosnen (Prut-Bystrytsia) Highland. The highest point of that highland is Mount Hostra, 425 metres (1,394 ft).

The closest neighboring city is Tysmenytsia, less than 10 kilometres (6.2 mi) to the east. Other cities that lie in the radius of 25 to 30 km (16 to 19 mi) are Tlumach (east), Nadvirna (south), Kalush (west), and Halych (north). The city also administers five adjacent villages that surround it: Mykytyntsi, Krykhivtsi, Vovchynets, Uhornyky, and Khryplyn.

=== Climate ===
As is the case with most of Ukraine, the climate is moderate continental with warm summers, and fairly cold winters. The following climate data provided is for the past 62 years. The average number of days with precipitation is 170 spread almost equally throughout a year. Most precipitation takes place during the winter months and least in early autumn. Thunderstorms occur mostly in summer months averaging around 25 annually. Ivano-Frankivsk averages about 296 days of fog or misty days with about 24 per month.

Climate data for Ivano-Frankivsk (1991–2020, extremes 1948–present)
Month	Jan	Feb	Mar	Apr	May	Jun	Jul	Aug	Sep	Oct	Nov	Dec	Year
Record high °C (°F)	20.0 (68.0)	20.9 (69.6)	26.8 (80.2)	30.4 (86.7)	32.2 (90.0)	35.4 (95.7)	37.1 (98.8)	37.8 (100.0)	36.3 (97.3)	28.4 (83.1)	22.1 (71.8)	19.1 (66.4)	37.8 (100.0)
Mean daily maximum °C (°F)	0.8 (33.4)	3.0 (37.4)	8.1 (46.6)	15.3 (59.5)	20.5 (68.9)	23.7 (74.7)	25.8 (78.4)	25.5 (77.9)	20.0 (68.0)	14.1 (57.4)	7.1 (44.8)	1.8 (35.2)	13.8 (56.8)
Daily mean °C (°F)	−3.0 (26.6)	−1.5 (29.3)	2.8 (37.0)	9.1 (48.4)	14.1 (57.4)	17.7 (63.9)	19.5 (67.1)	18.9 (66.0)	13.8 (56.8)	8.3 (46.9)	3.0 (37.4)	−1.7 (28.9)	8.4 (47.1)
Mean daily minimum °C (°F)	−6.7 (19.9)	−5.3 (22.5)	−1.8 (28.8)	3.2 (37.8)	8.1 (46.6)	12.0 (53.6)	13.8 (56.8)	13.0 (55.4)	8.4 (47.1)	3.7 (38.7)	−0.4 (31.3)	−5.0 (23.0)	3.6 (38.5)
Record low °C (°F)	−33.9 (−29.0)	−32.5 (−26.5)	−26.1 (−15.0)	−11.1 (12.0)	−3.9 (25.0)	0.0 (32.0)	3.9 (39.0)	3.4 (38.1)	−4.0 (24.8)	−14.2 (6.4)	−18.7 (−1.7)	−35.7 (−32.3)	−35.7 (−32.3)
Average precipitation mm (inches)	29 (1.1)	32 (1.3)	40 (1.6)	44 (1.7)	80 (3.1)	94 (3.7)	94 (3.7)	65 (2.6)	68 (2.7)	50 (2.0)	32 (1.3)	33 (1.3)	661 (26.0)
Average precipitation days (≥ 1.0 mm)	7.8	7.9	8.6	8.5	10.6	10.7	10.5	8.5	8.4	7.4	7.0	8.2	104.1
Average snowy days	14	13	9	3	0	0	0	0	0	1	7	13	60
Average relative humidity (%)	83.0	80.2	75.0	68.8	71.8	74.2	73.9	74.9	79.0	81.6	85.8	86.3	77.9
Source 1: Pogoda.ru.net, NOAA (precipitation, humidity, and precipitation days 1991–2020)
Source 2: Weatherbase (snow days)

== Demographics ==
Historical population
Year	Pop.	±%
1939	65,000	—
1959	66,456	+2.2%
1970	104,971	+58.0%
1979	149,747	+42.7%
1989	214,021	+42.9%
2001	218,359	+2.0%
2011	224,585	+2.9%
2022	238,196	+6.1%

Note: Historical population record is taken out of Ivano-Frankivsk portal, more recent – the Regional Directorate of Statistics. There is also other information on a population growth such as the JewishGen. With asterisk there are identified years of approximate data. In the 18th century, differentiation among Poles and Ukrainians was by religious background rather than ethnic (Catholics vs. Orthodox).

1732 Population

- Slavs – 1,518
- Jews – 1,420
- Armenians – 333
- not known – 29

1792 Population

- Slavs – 2,526
- Jews – 2,412
- Armenians – 510

1869 Population

- Jews – 8,088
- Poles – 4,221
- Ukrainians – 2,236
- others – 186
- Armenians – 55

1880 Population

- Jews – 10,023
- Poles – 5,584
- Ukrainians – 2,794
- Germans – 135
- Armenians – 90

1900 Population

- Jews – 13,826
- Poles – 8,334
- Ukrainians – 4,606
- Germans – 149
- Armenians – 58
- Czech – 39

1910 Population

- Jews – 15,161
- Poles – 9,065
- Ukrainians – 5,624

1921 Population

- Poles – 21,581
- Jews – 20,208
- Ukrainians – 8,441
- Germans – 1,076
- others – 74
- Czech – 11

Ethnic composition of the population in 1959–2001
Ethnicity	1959	1970	1979	1989	2001
Ukrainians	43,858	76,474	114,500	169,795	212,577
Poles	1,958	1,459	1,256	1,060	653
Jews	2,136	2,237	1,778	1,406	256
Russians	16,892	22,313	26,694	35,015	13,876
Belarusians	628	1,236	1,056	1,683	633
Others	984	1,252	1,309	2,273	1,263

=== Language ===
Distribution of the population by native language according to the 2001 census:

Language	Number	Percentage
Ukrainian	198 468	92.19%
Russian	14 614	6.79%
Other or undecided	2 206	1.02%
Total	215 288	100.00%

According to a survey conducted by the International Republican Institute in April–May 2023, 97% of the city's population spoke Ukrainian at home, and 3% spoke Russian.

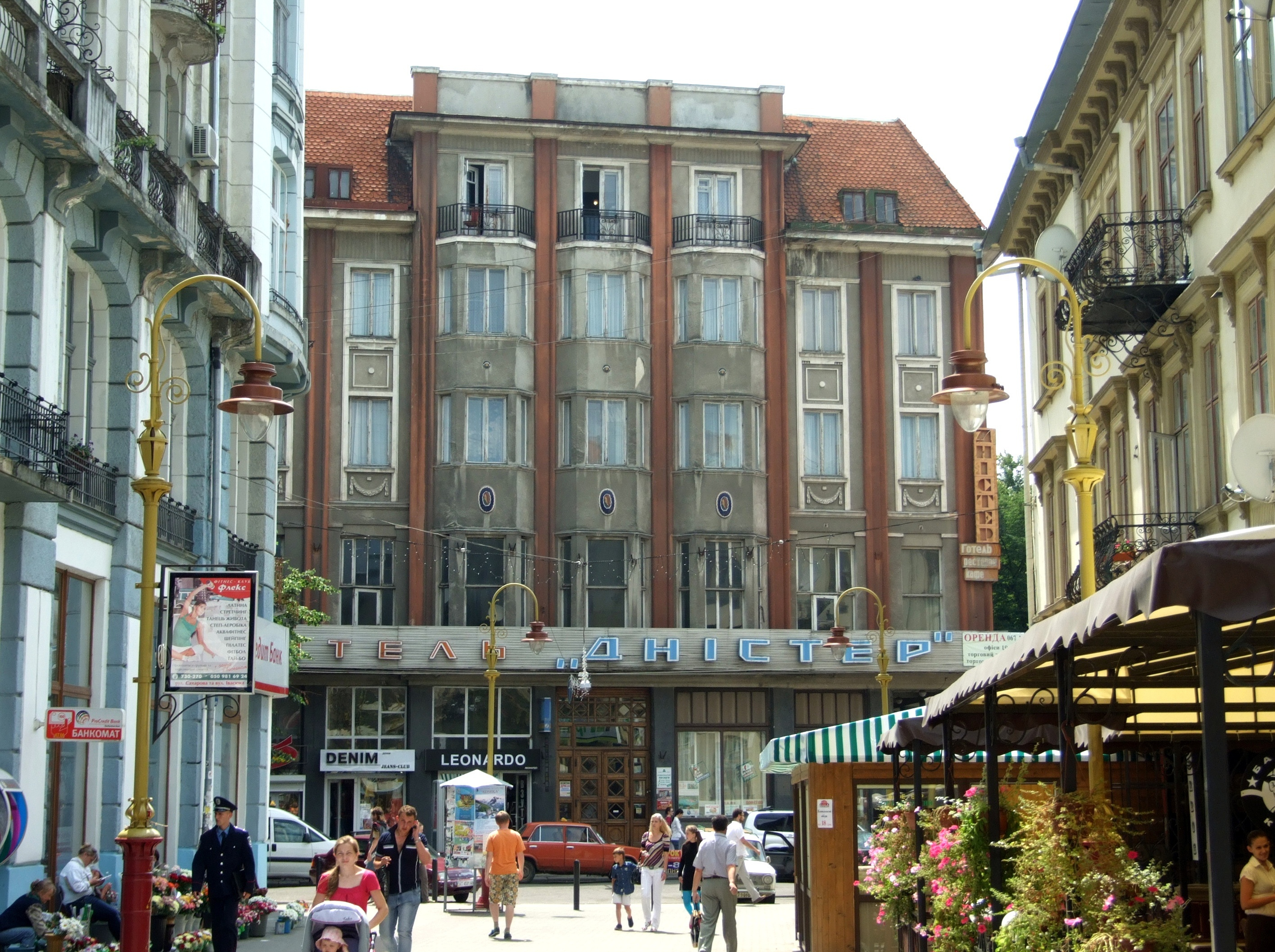
View of Sichovykh Striltsiv Street from Viche Maidan

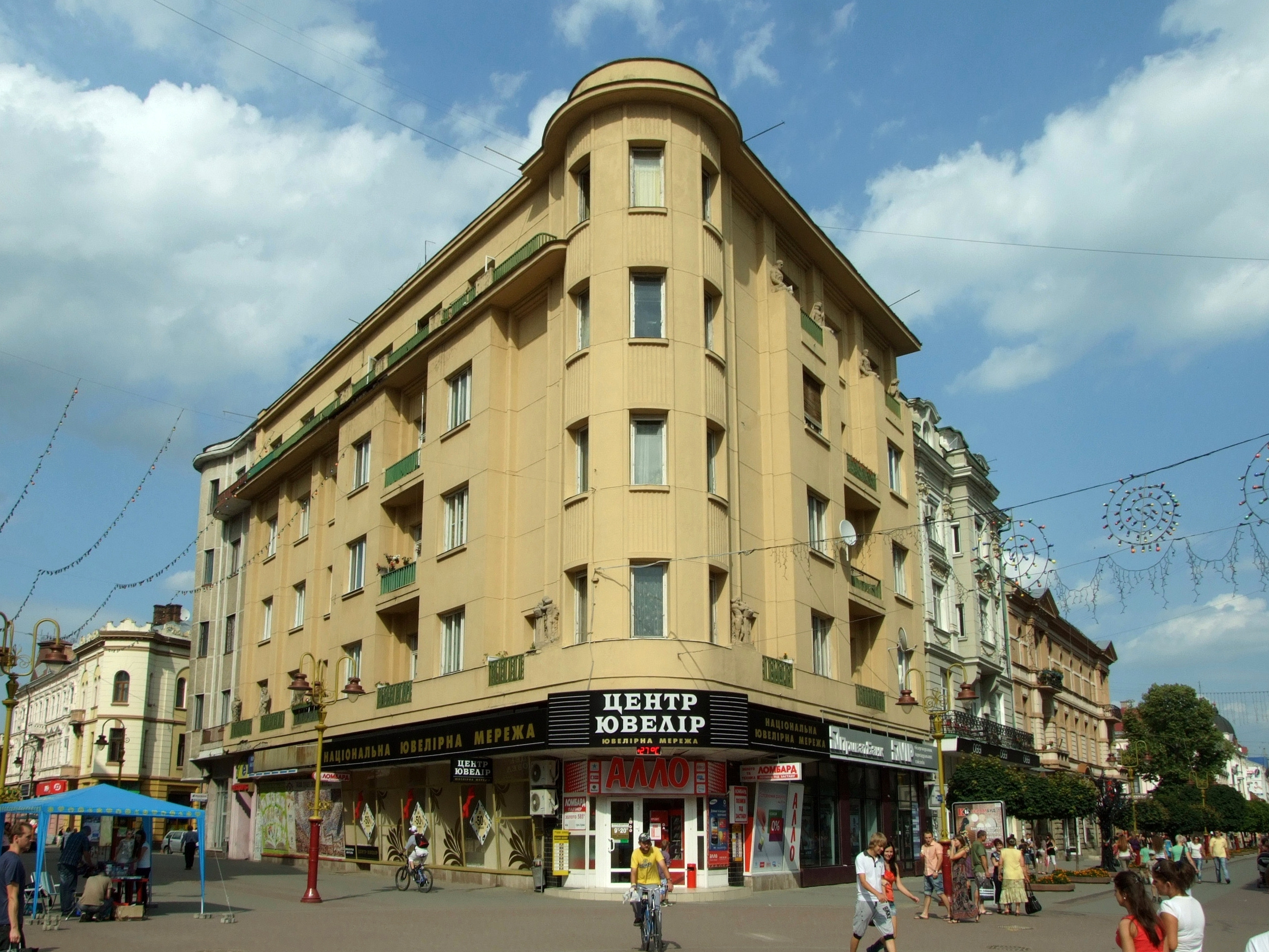
Viche Maidan, the corner of Vitovsky Street and Independence Street

=== Administration ===
Both city and oblast administrations as well as the regional council are all located in a massive white building on Hrushevsky Street locally known as Bily Dim or Bily Budynok. In front of the building, there is a big open space bordered by Shpytalna Street on the north-east, Hrushevsky Street on the south-east, and Melnychuk Street on the south-west. Next to the building, there is a memorial to the Unification of the Western Ukraine with the rest of Ukraine. The main feature of the memorial is a tall marble stele, both sides of which are adorned with statues: kamenyar (west) and kobzar (east).

=== City Council ===
The Ivano-Frankivsk City Council currently consists of 42 deputies. The political representation after the 2020 Ukrainian local elections by political blocs was elected as such: 28 seats for Svoboda, 10 seats for European Solidarity and 4 seats for Batkivschyna.

=== Recent city mayors ===
- Bohdan Borovych (OUN) July 1994 – June 1998
- Zinoviy Shkutiak (Our Ukraine) March 1998 – 26 March 2006
- Viktor Anuškevičius (UPP) 26 March 2006–2015
- Ruslan Martsinkiv (All-Ukrainian Union «Svoboda») 2015–present

In the (first round of the) 2020 Ukrainian local elections Martsinkiv was reelected with about 85% of the vote.

=== Streets ===
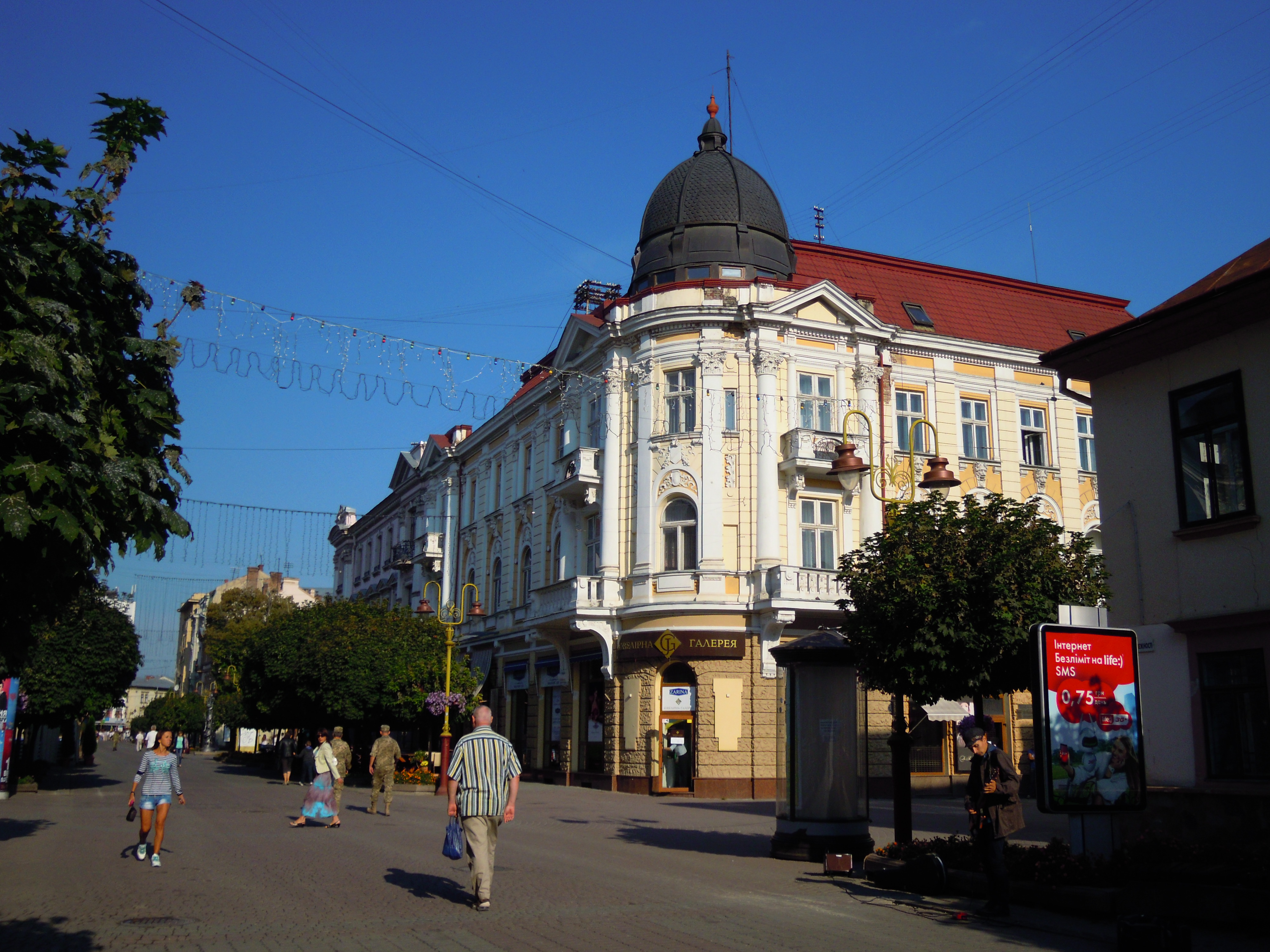
A part of Nezalezhnosti Street (Independence Street) – so-called 'Stometrivka'

All street names reflecting the city's Soviet or Russian past have been returned to their former names, or given new names of national historic importance, or other non-controversial names. For example, Gagarin Street (connecting the city with its suburbs) became Vovchynets Street, Suvorov Street is now Harbar Street, and Soviet Street is Independence Street.

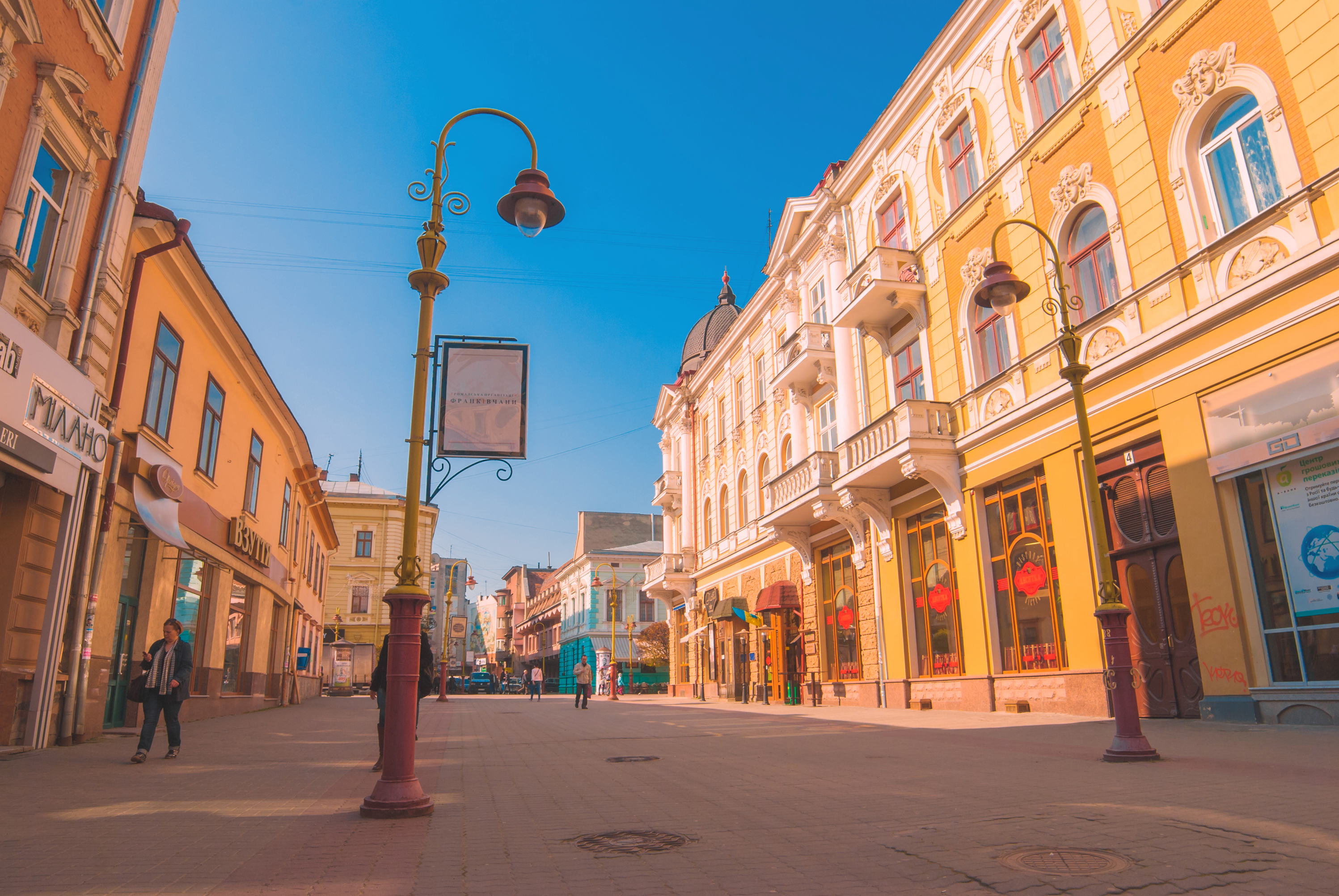
Shopping street in central Ivano-Frankivsk

Around 100 other streets were renamed.

Important transportation arteries

- Independence Street (vulytsia Nezalezhnosti) / Tysmenytsia Road (doroha Tysmenetska)
- Halych Road (vulytsia Halytska)
- Hetman Mazepa Street (vulytsia Hetmana Mazepy) / Krykhivtsi Road (doroha Krykhivetska)
- Yevhen Konovalets Road (vulytsia Yevhena Konovaltsia)
- Vovchynets Street (vulytsia Vovchynetska)
- Vasyl Stefanyk Shore Drive (naberezhna Vasylia Stefanyka)

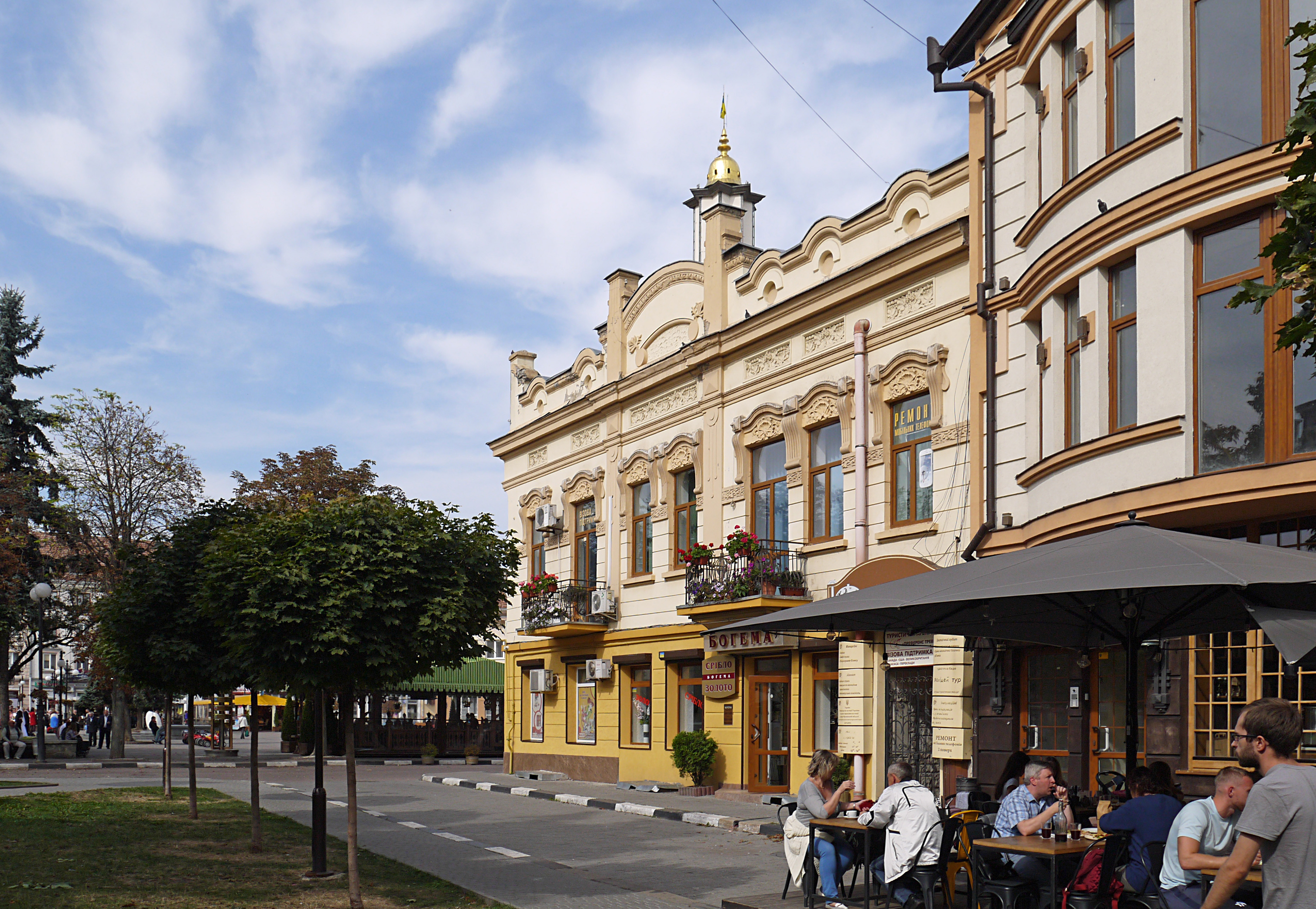
One of many street cafes in the city centre

=== City squares ===
The city has seven main city squares, four of them located in the "old town" part of the city.

- Viche Maidan
- Market Square
- Sheptytskyi Square
- Pryvokzalna Square
- Mickiewicz Square (Mickiewicz Park)
- Liberation Square
- European Square

=== Rural–urban fringe districts ===
Like a lot of regional centers in Ukraine and the former Soviet Union, Ivano-Frankivsk is well known for its rural–urban fringe panel building residential districts, too.

- BAM
- Kaskad
- Positron
- Budivelnykiv

== Transport ==
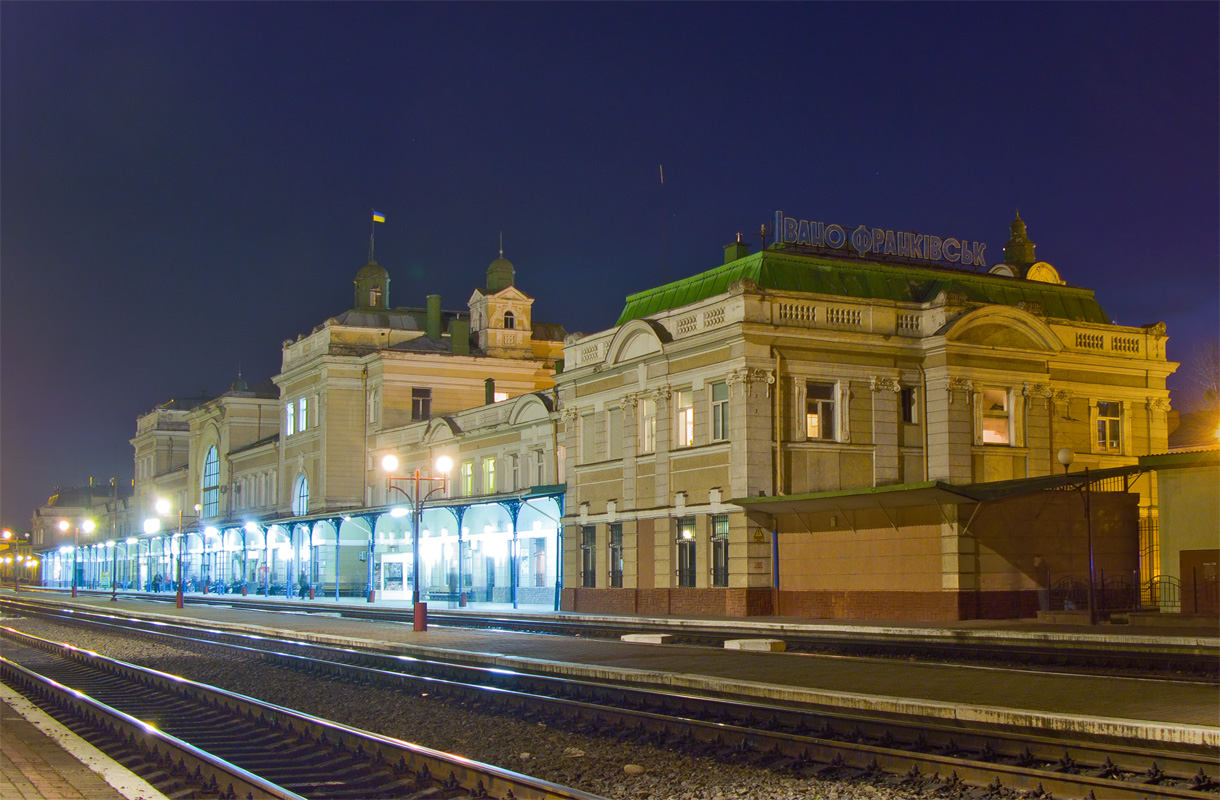
Ivano-Frankivsk Railway Station

Public transportation

The city of Ivano-Frankivsk has an extensive network of public transport including buses, trolleybuses, and taxis. There are nine trolleybus routes and about 52 for regular buses. Some of the routes run beyond the city into nearby villages.

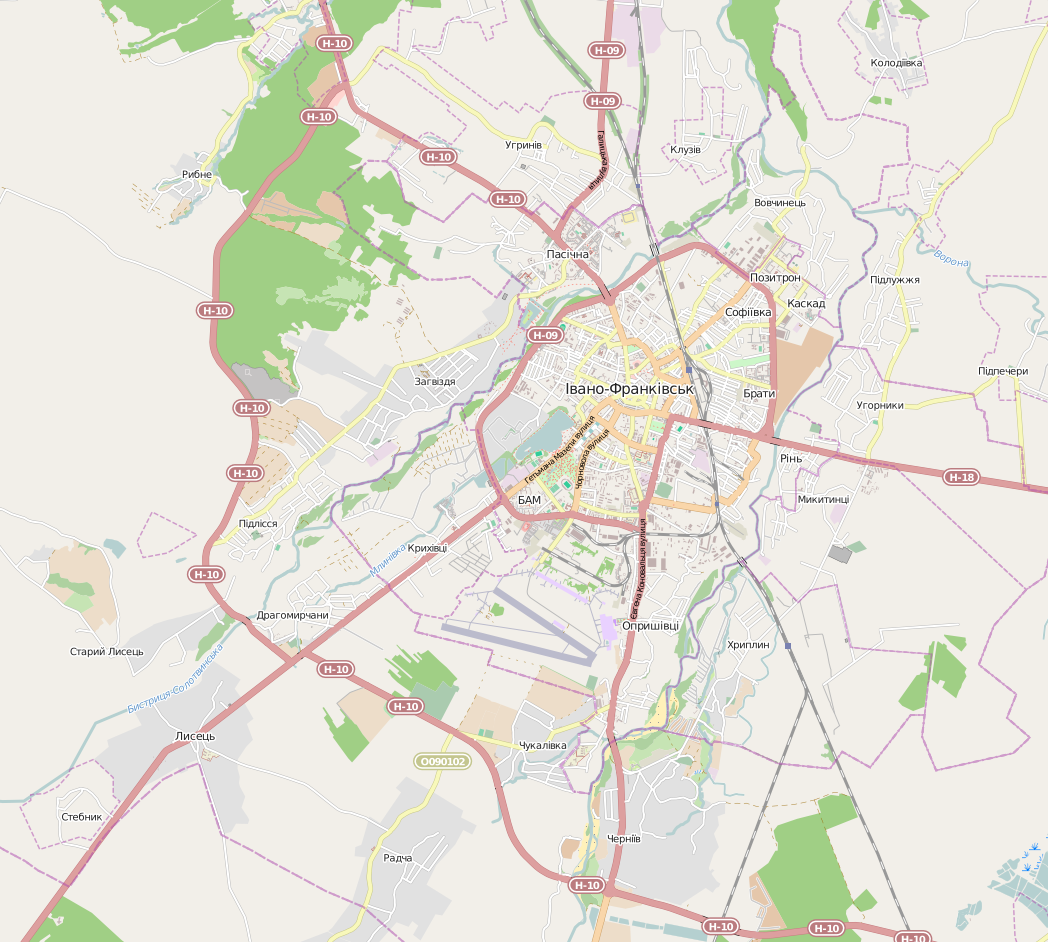
Road map of Ivano-Frankivsk

Railway transportation

The city is served by the Ivano-Frankivsk railway station. There are also smaller railway stations in adjacent villages, including Uhryniv and Khryplyn. All of them are part of Lviv Railways.

Bus transportation

Until 2008, the railway terminal also housed a bus terminal which provided several inter-city bus routes, including some to international destinations. In 2000, construction began on a new bus terminal next to the railway terminus on Zaliznychna Street. Inauguration of the new bus terminal took place on 22 May 2010. At the opening ceremony the Mayor of the city, Viktor Anushkevičius, noted that the new bus terminal was only partially completed, and for a period it would be necessary to offload passengers at the Pryvokzalna Square, which is already saturated with traffic. He also emphasised the need for another bus station on the outskirts of the city.

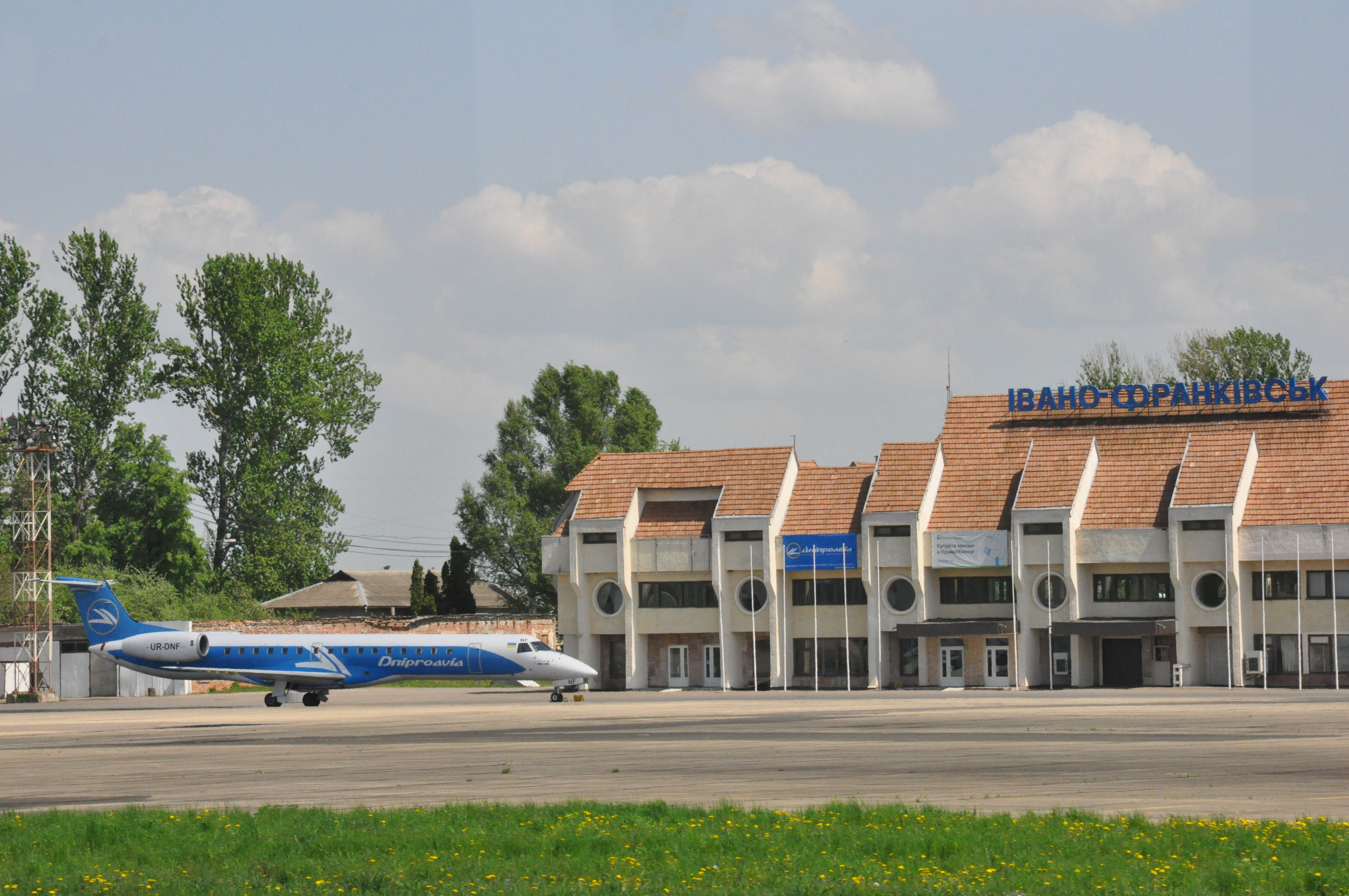
Ivano-Frankivsk International Airport

Airways transportation

The city is served by Ivano-Frankivsk International Airport, which was granted international status in 1992. The airport shares its facilities with the 114 Brigade of the Ukrainian Air Force. Since 2002, the airport has been leased to the private enterprise company Yavson, and from 2005 the Public limited company Naftokhimik Prykarpattia, a (subsidiary of Ukrnafta). The contract with Naftokhimik Prykarpattia expired in 2013.

Lodging

There are many lodging options in Ivano-Frankivsk. Ivano-Frankivsk has one four-star hotel ("Park Hotel") and three three-star hotels ("Nadia", "Auscoprut", "Pid Templem").

=== Routes ===
The city of Ivano-Frankivsk is located on the intersection of three major national (Ukraine) routes: H 18, H 09, and H 10. There also is one important regional route T09-06. All the H-routes eventually connect to E50.

== Education ==
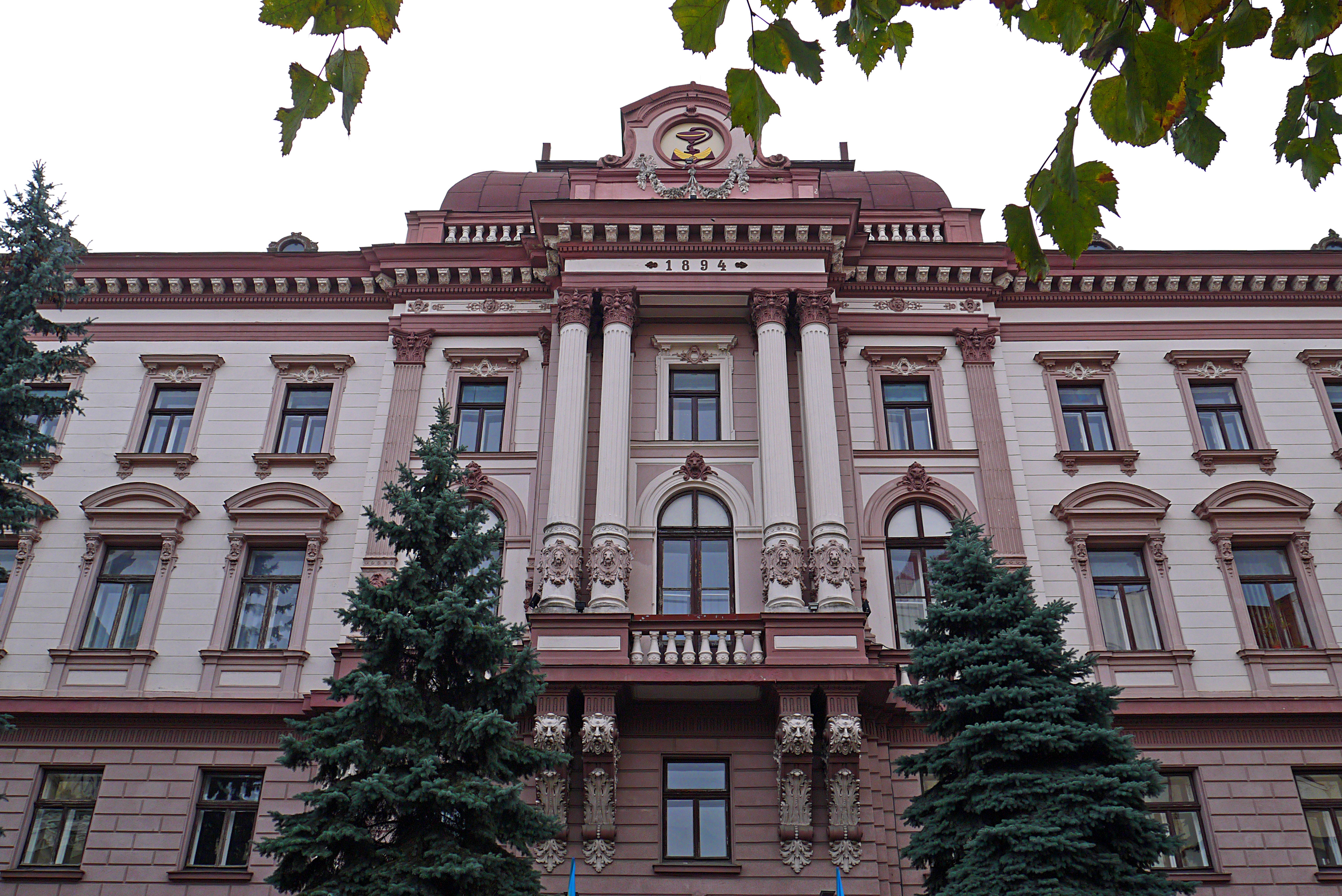
Ivano-Frankivsk National Medical University

The city has over 25 public schools of general education for grades 1 through 11, including the Ukrainian gymnasium No. 1. There are also some privately owned schools and lyceums. In addition, the city has several professional public institutes.

There are also numerous sports schools: Fitness Sport Association "Ukraine" – 5 schools, MVK – 3 schools, Fitness Sport Association "Spartak" – 2 schools, Fitness Sport Association "Kolos" – 1 school, and the others.

=== Universities ===
The city has six universities, the Ivano-Frankivsk Institute of Management that is a local campus of Ternopil National Economic University, and the Ivano-Frankivsk Institute of Management and Economics "Halytska Akademia". All of which are state funded.

1. Vasyl Stefanyk Precarpathian National University
2. Ivano-Frankivsk National Technical University of Oil and Gas (University of Oil and Gas)
3. Ivano-Frankivsk National Medical University
4. King Daniel of Galicia Ivano-Frankivsk University of Law
5. Ivano-Frankivsk Theological Academy of Greek-Catholic Church
6. West Ukrainian University of Economics and Law

== Culture and sports ==
=== Architecture ===
- Remains of the Stanislaviv fortress compound built in the 17th century
- Collegiate Church of Virgin Mary, today the Regional Art Museum, built in the late 17th and the early 18th century in Baroque style
- Greek Catholic Cathedral of the Holy Resurrection, originally Jesuite church built 1752–1761 in Baroque style
- Armenian church (presently used by one of the Ukrainian Orthodox Churches), built 1743–1763 in Baroque style
- Potocki Palace – originally built 1672–1682 and rebuilt as a military hospital in 1809; since 2024 it houses the museum "City and Weapons"
- Former Austrian Railway Directorate, today the Ivano-Frankivsk National Medical University, built 1894 by Ernest Bowdish
- Tempel Synagogue, built 1895–1899 by Wilhelm Stiassny
- Ivano-Frankivsk railway station, originally built in 1866 and rebuilt 1903–1906 by Ernst Baudisch
- Hartenberg Passage, built in 1904 by Karel Boblik
- Former Austria hotel at 12 Sichovyh Striltsiv Street (1913)
- Church of St. Joseph, built 1911–1913 by Felicjan Bajan
- Modernist town hall, today a local history museum, built 1928–1935 by Stanisław Trela
- Modernist post office at 13a Sichovyh Striltsiv Street, built 1937–1939 by Bohdan Lachert
- Ivan-Franko National Academic Drama Theater – post-war modernism
- City Brewery
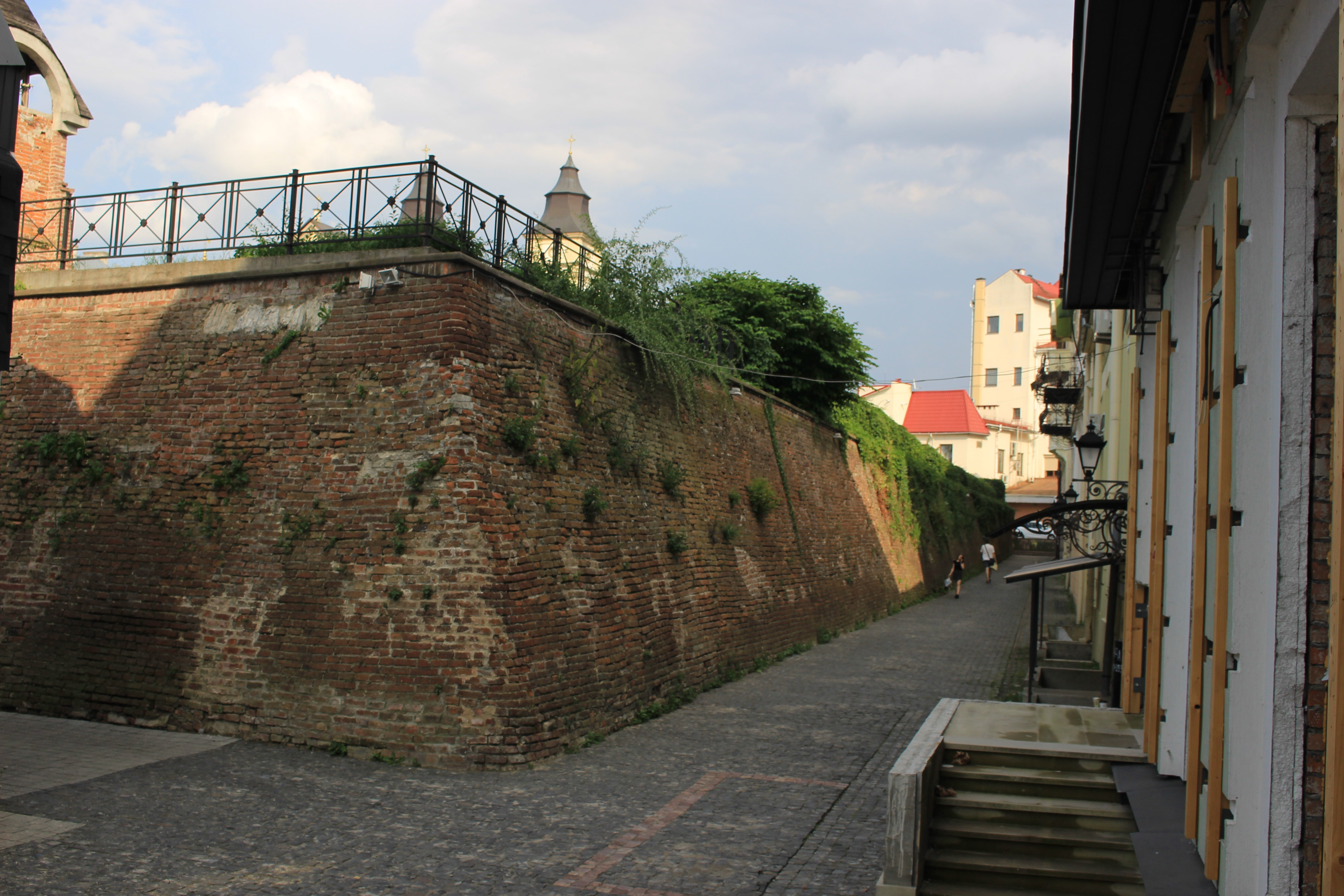
Remains of the Stanislaviv fortress on Fortechnyi Ln

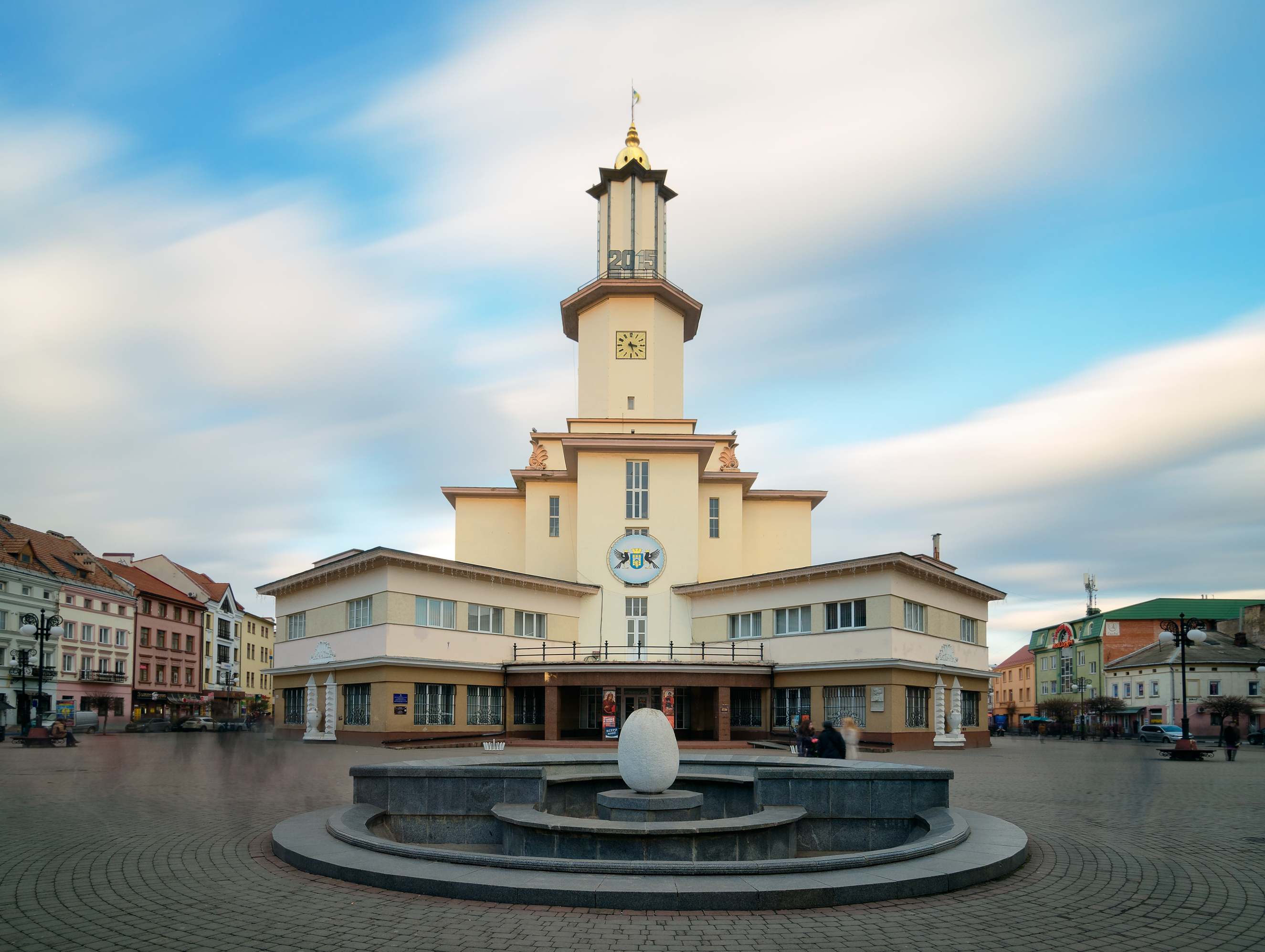
Rynok Square with the town hall

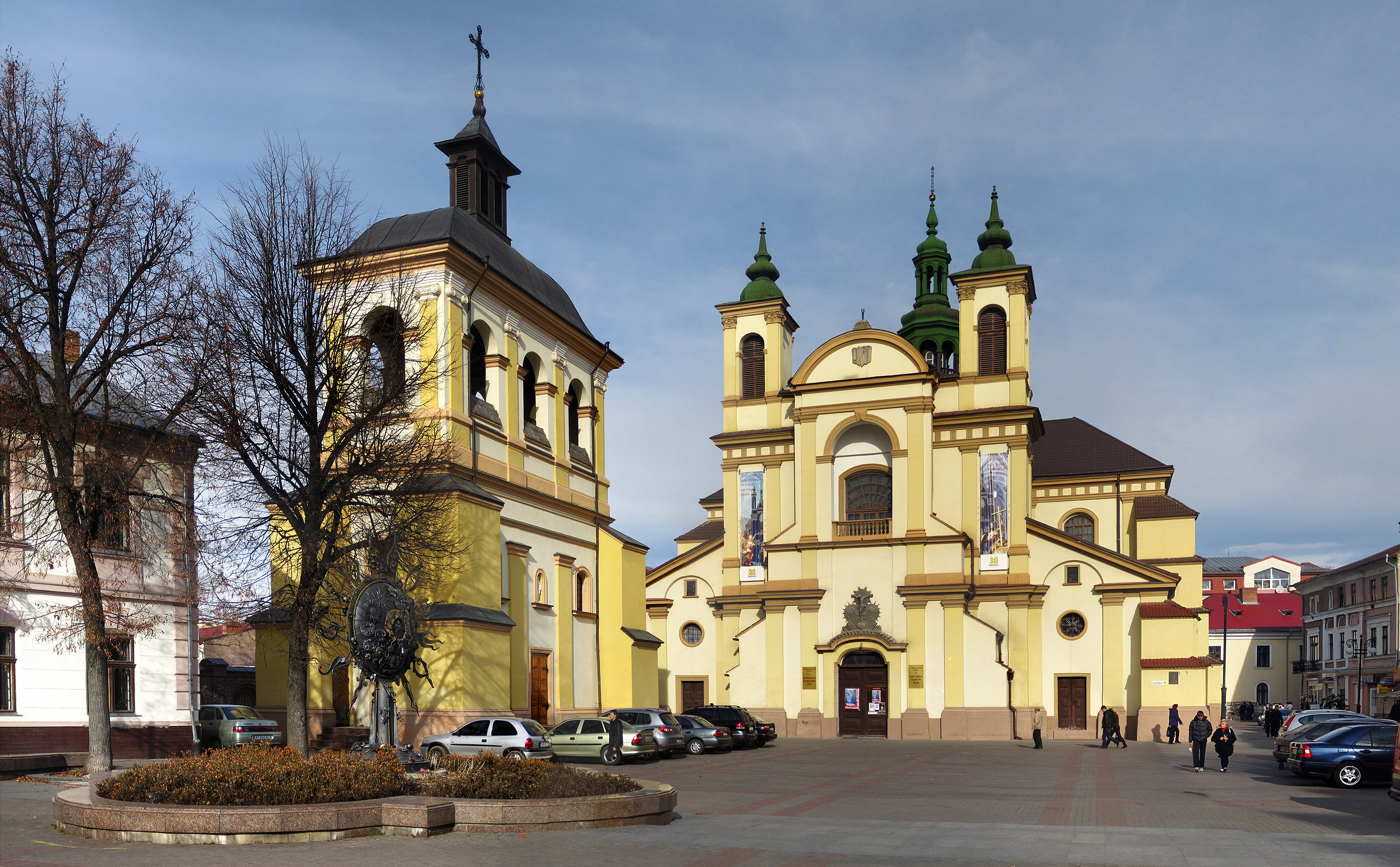
Collegiate Church of Virgin Mary

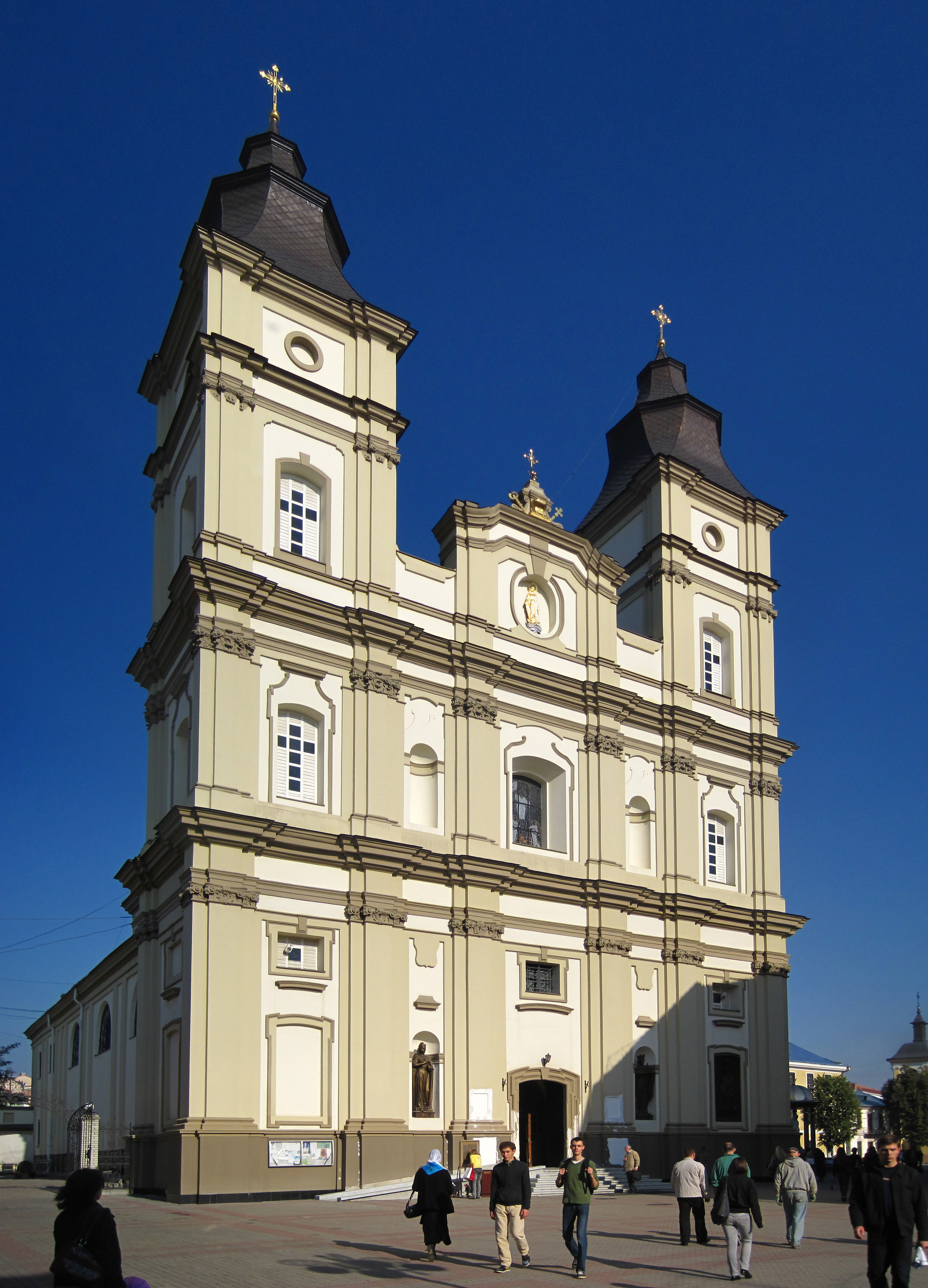
Resurrection Cathedral

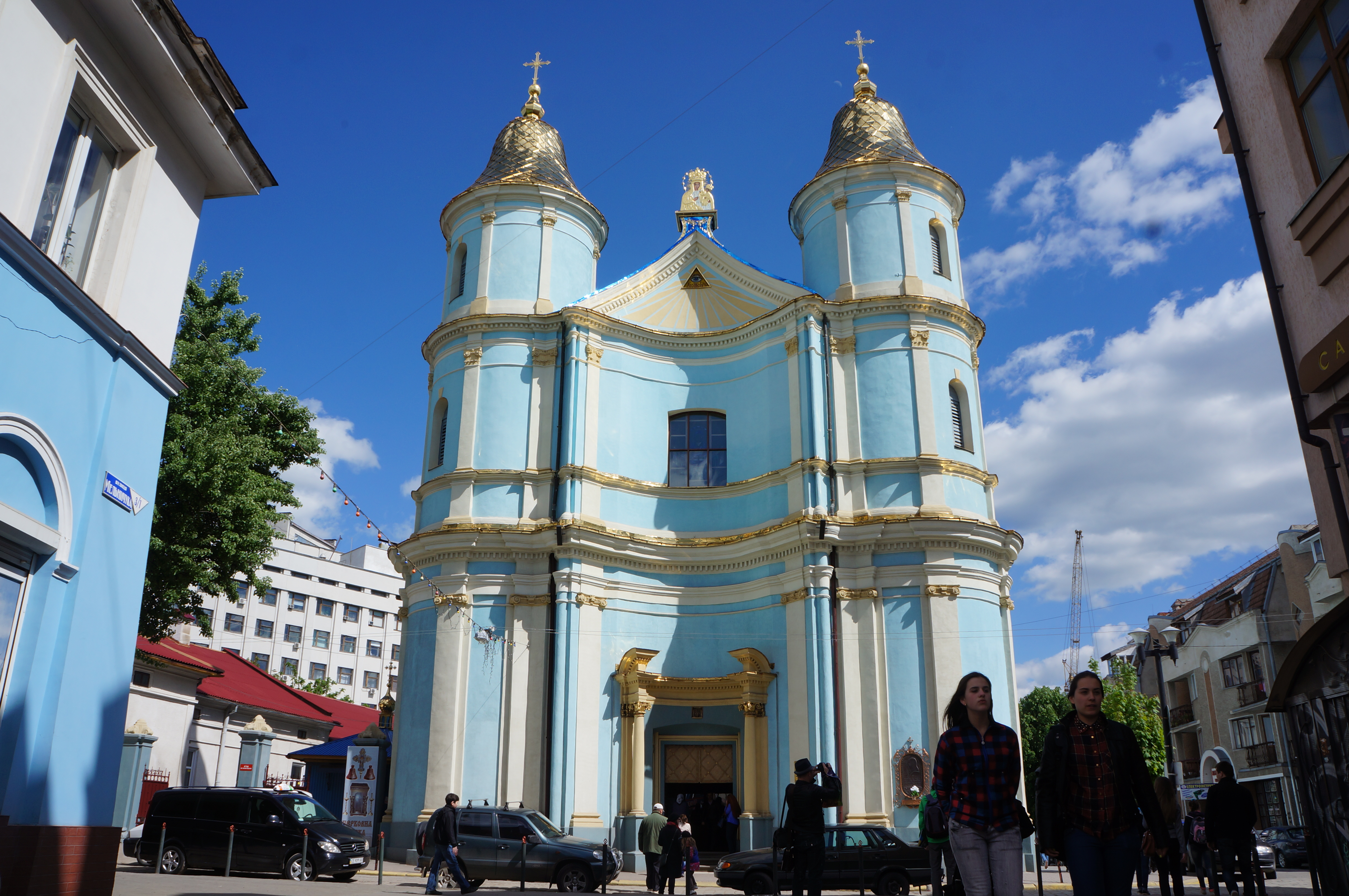
Armenian Church

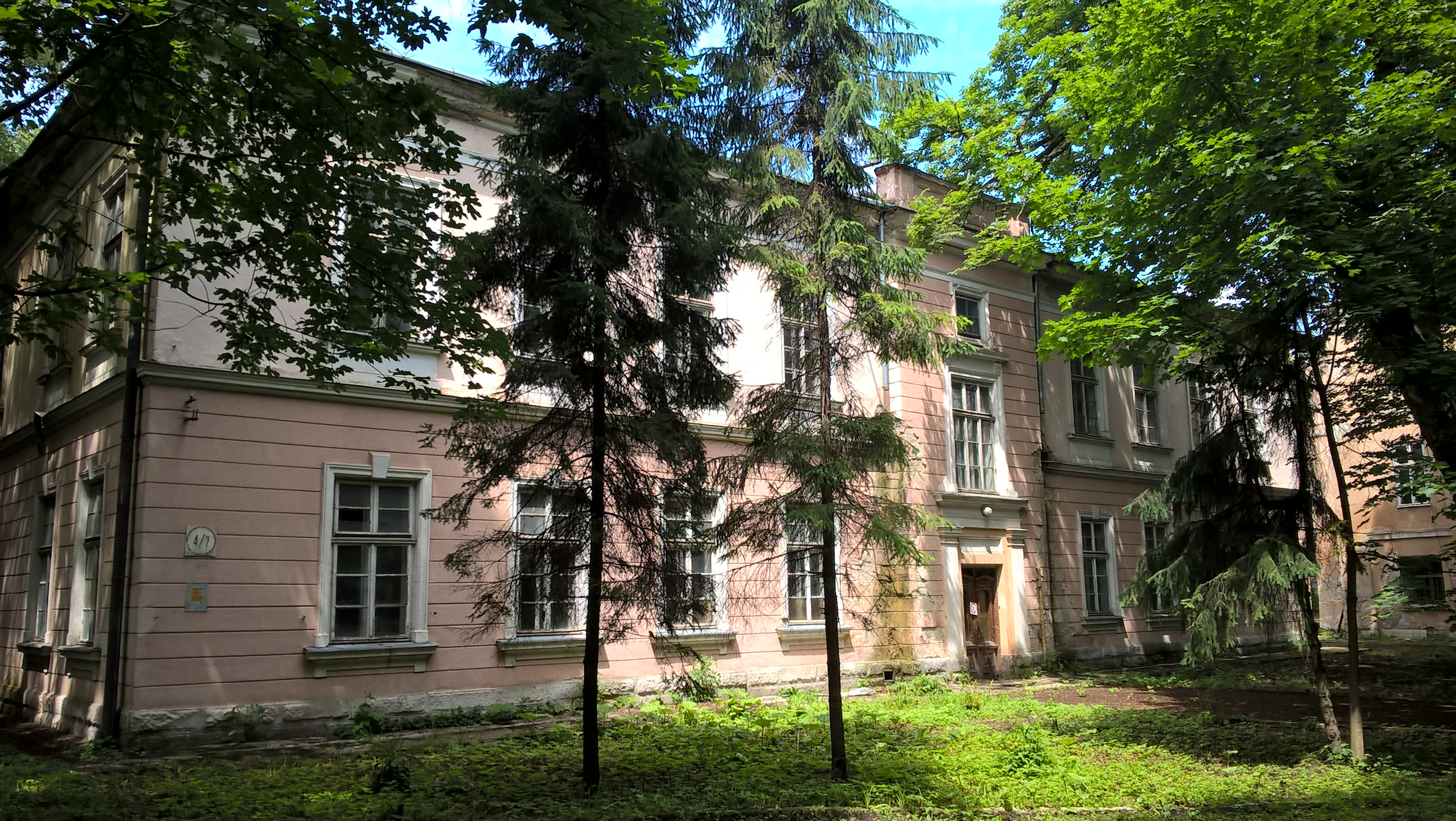
Former Potocki Palace

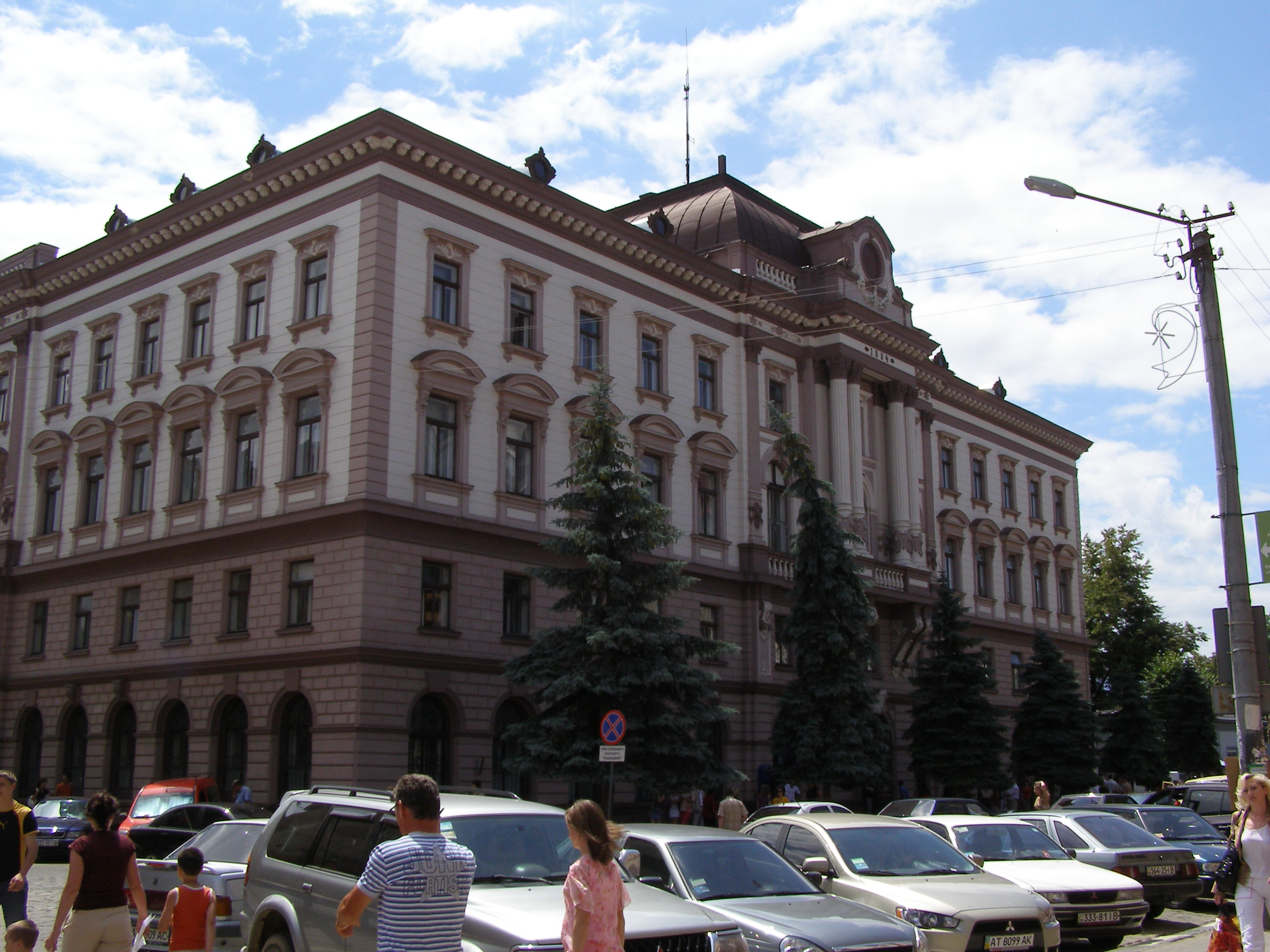
Former Austrian Railway Directorate, today the Ivano-Frankivsk National Medical University

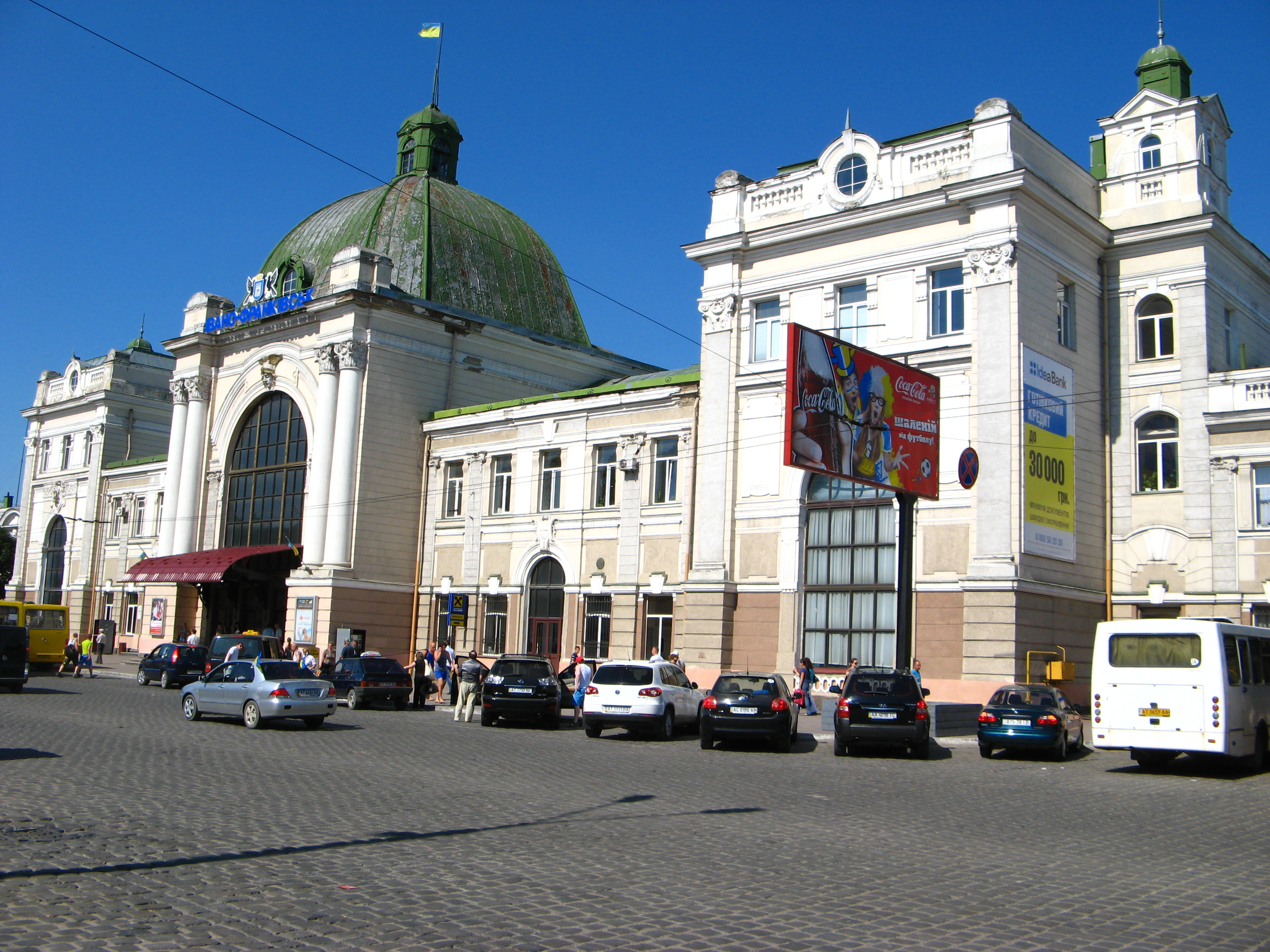
Ivano-Frankivsk railway station

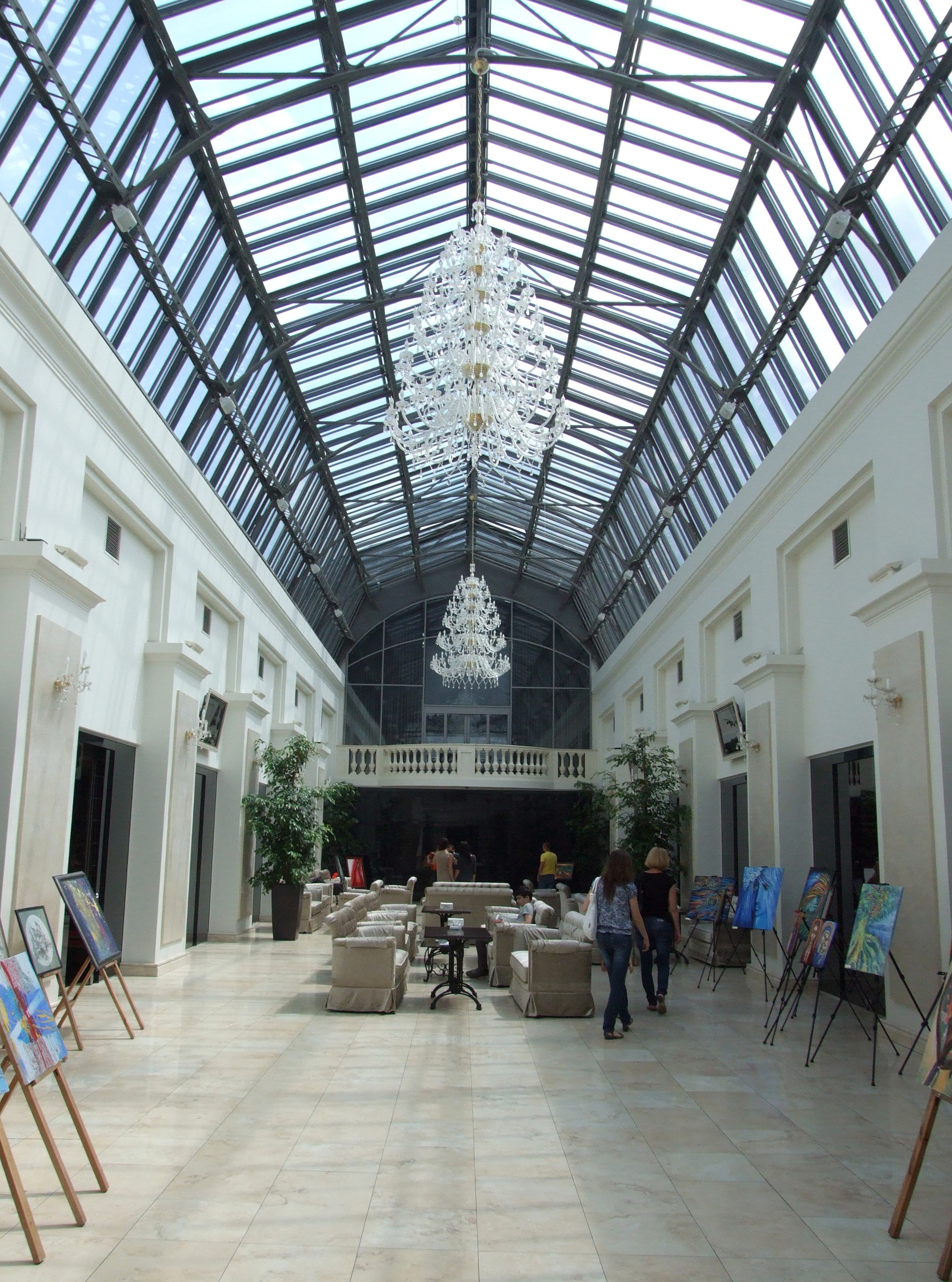
Hartenberg Passage

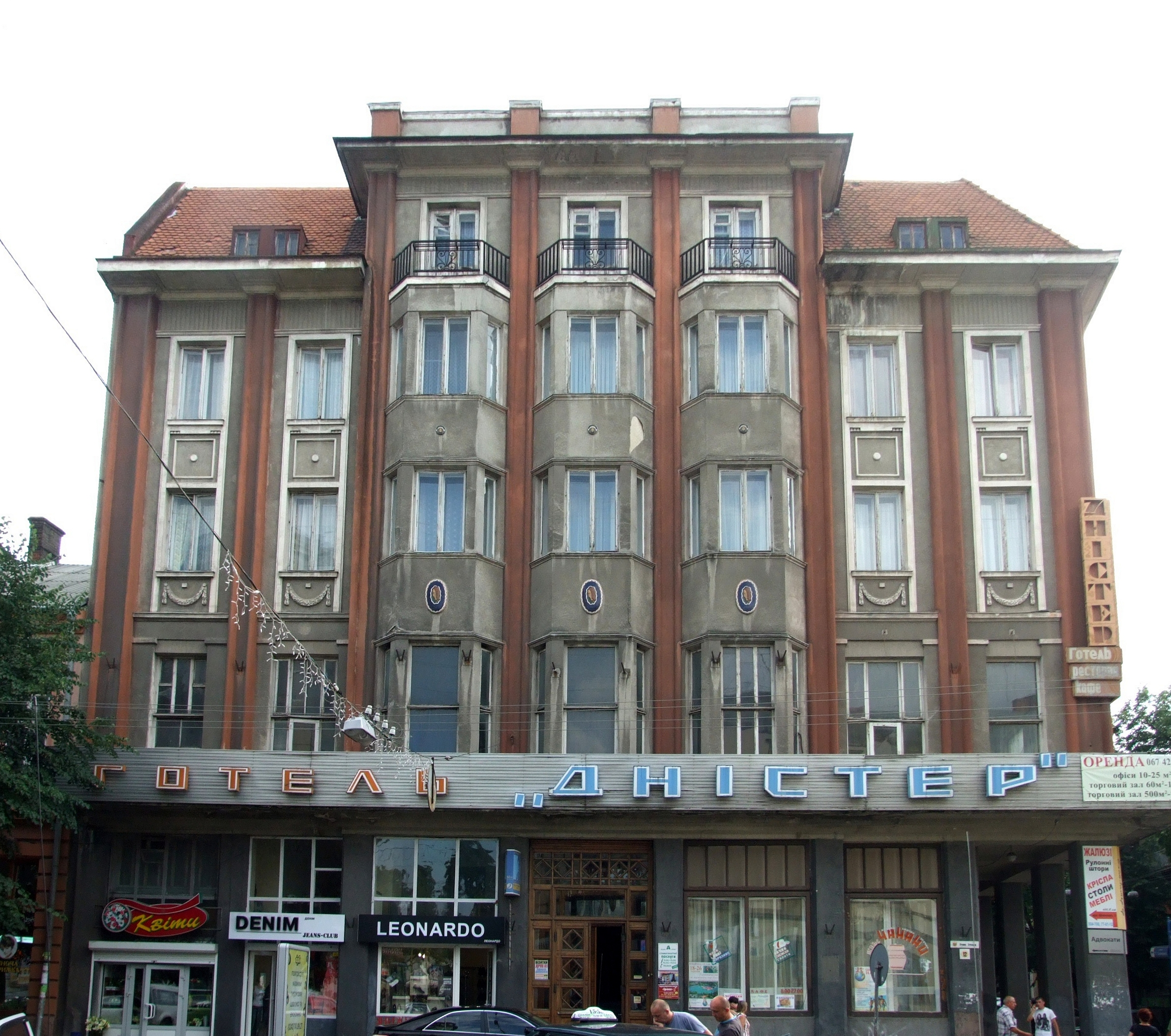
Former Austria hotel at 12 Sichovyh Striltsiv Street

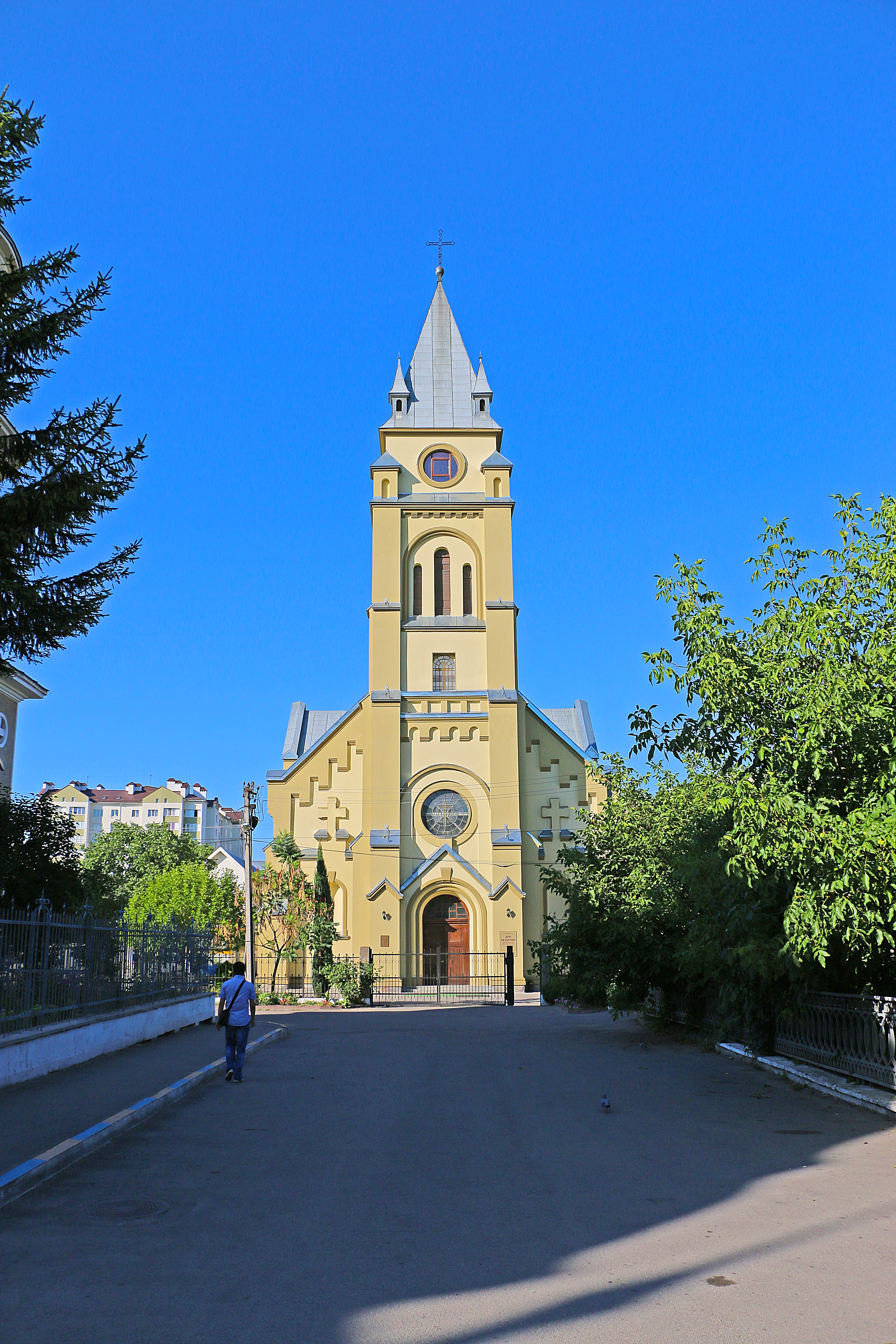
Church of St. Joseph

==== Other attractions ====
- Market Square with the city's old town hall, today hosting an ethno-cultural museum.
- Shevchenko Park, a big park that consists of an amusement park, a big lake with swans, couple of full-size football fields, and many other interesting places which are worth a visit.
- Bily Budynok, a big white building in the middle of the city and next to the Market place. It is the main administration building of Ivano-Frankivsk and Ivano-Frankivsk Oblast. In front of the building, there are two full-size sculptural monuments to Franko and Shevchenko.
- Bazaar, a huge area that covers the old market and the new market with a couple of supermarket stores locally known as the universal stores.
- 100 m (328.08 ft) stretch (stometrivka), unofficial local name for a part of Independence Street that consists of numerous shops and is restricted to pedestrian traffic only.

=== Monuments ===
- Battle of Grunwald monument – commemorating the victory of the Poland on Grunwald fields in 1410.
- Monument to Adam Mickiewicz (1930) – it was reconstructed in 1989, located in Adam Mickiewicz Square next to a regional concert (philharmonic) hall. It is the oldest surviving monument in the city and was built on 20 November 1898 (sculptor Tadeusz Błotnicki).
- Monument to Stepan Bandera and Museum of the Insurgent Army in European Square were awarded the best architectural project of 2007 designed by a local architecture company "Atelie Arkhitektury"

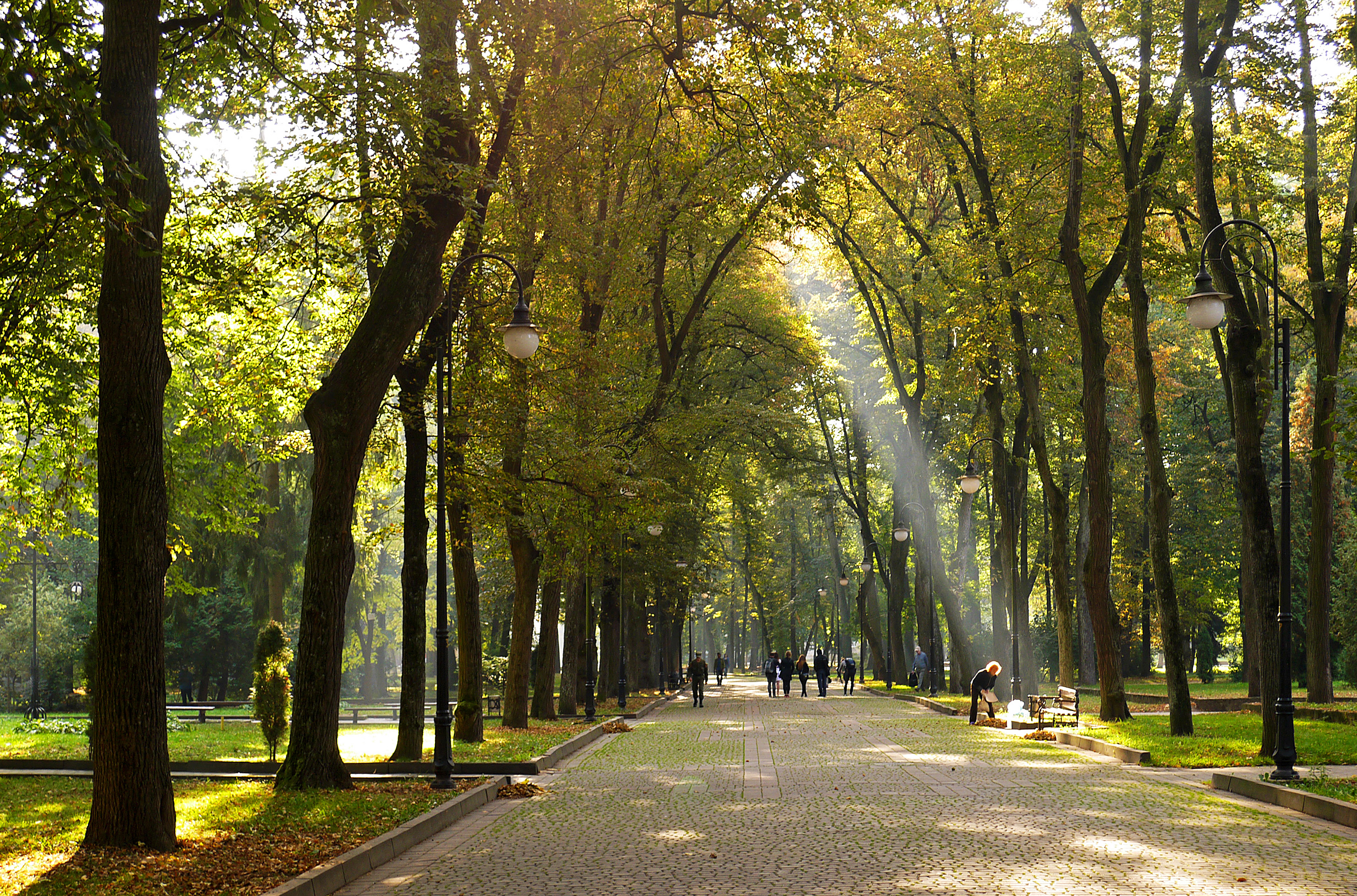
Shevchenko Park

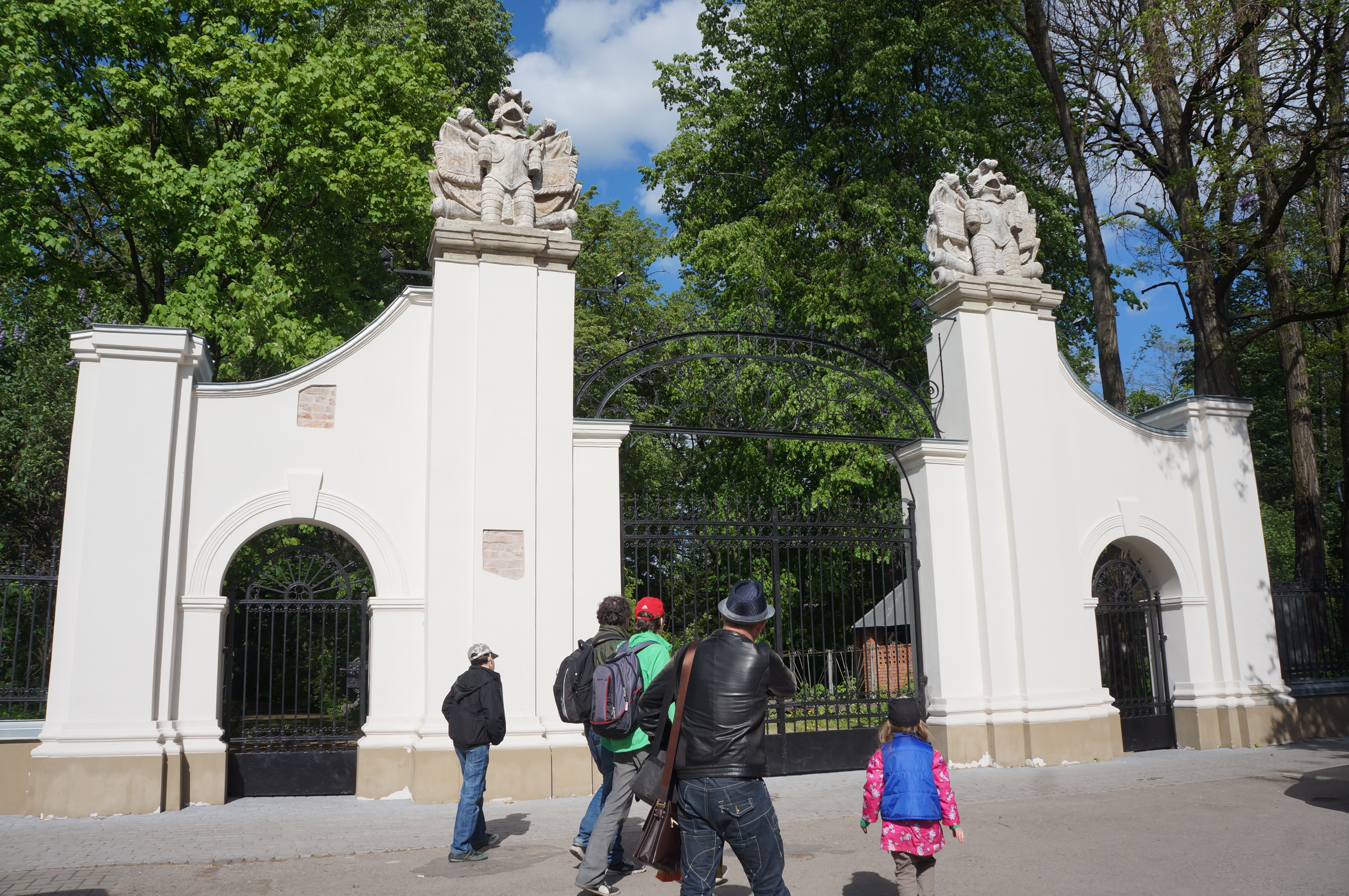
Potocki gates

=== Theaters and Cinemas ===
- Ivan Franko Academic Regional Music and Drama Theater
- Mariika Pidhirianka Academic Regional Puppet Theater
- Ivan Tobilevich Ukrainian National Theater
- Regional Philharmonic Society
- Lumiere Movie Theater (previously, Ivan Franko Movie Theater)
- Cosmos Movie Theater

Former

- Patriot Movie Theater
- Shevchenko Movie Theater (previously "Pioneer")
- "Videotech"
- Gorky Movie Theater
- Komsomolets Movie Theater
- Shevchenko Movie Theater (original)
- Trembita, a summer movie theater

=== City parks ===
- Shevchenko Park
- Park of Warriors-Internationalists
- Park "Valy"
- Pryvokzalny park
- Memorial Park, near Ivan Franko Academic Regional Music and Drama Theater

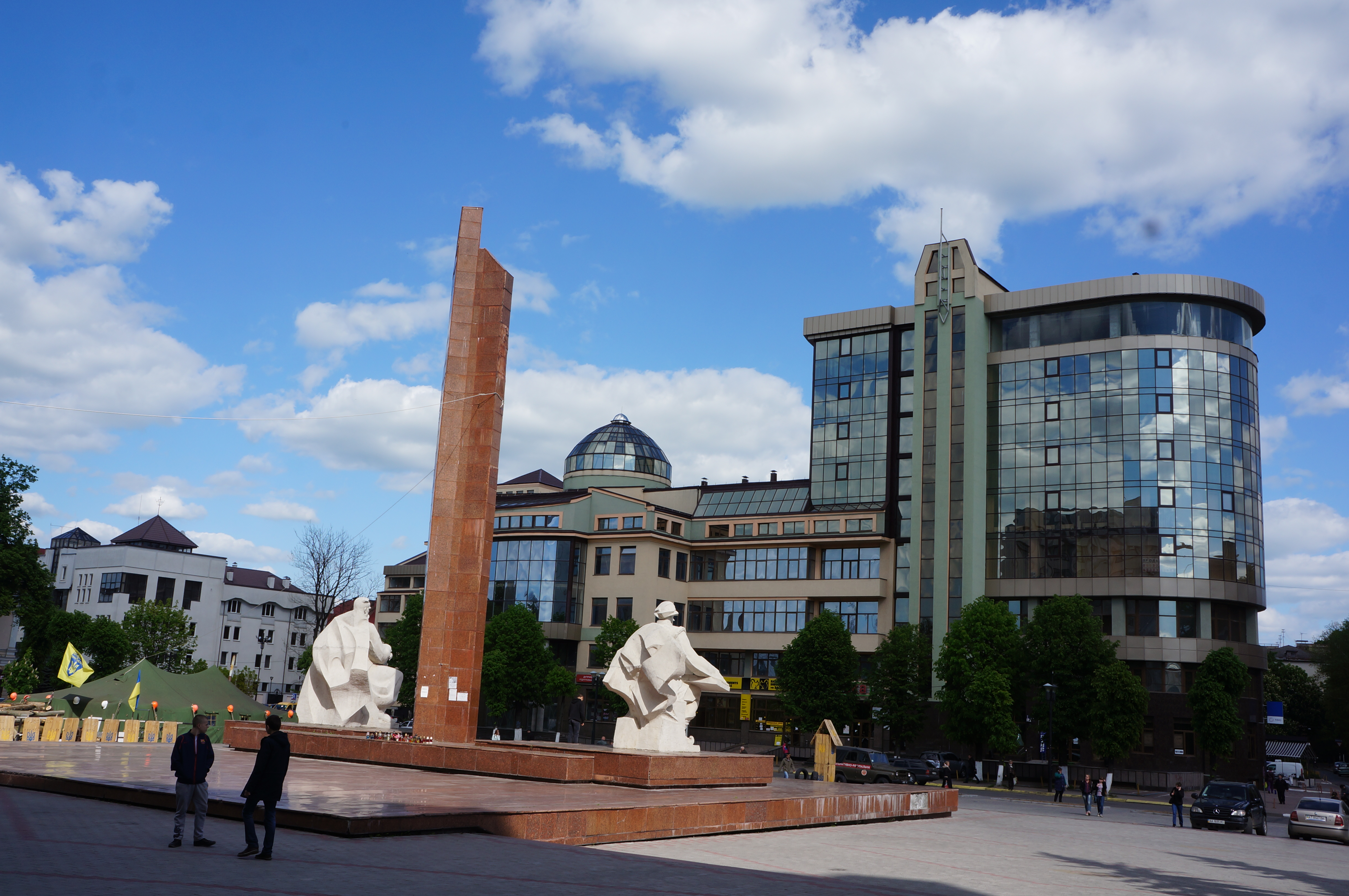
Monument in front of the State Administration Building

=== Festivals ===
- Sviato Kovaliv (Blacksmiths festival)
- Karpatskyi Prostir (Carpathian Space)
- Koliada na Maizliakh Christmas Festival
- Prykarpattia Honey Fest
- Holiday of Grapes and Wine
- Stanislavska Marmuliada

=== Sports ===
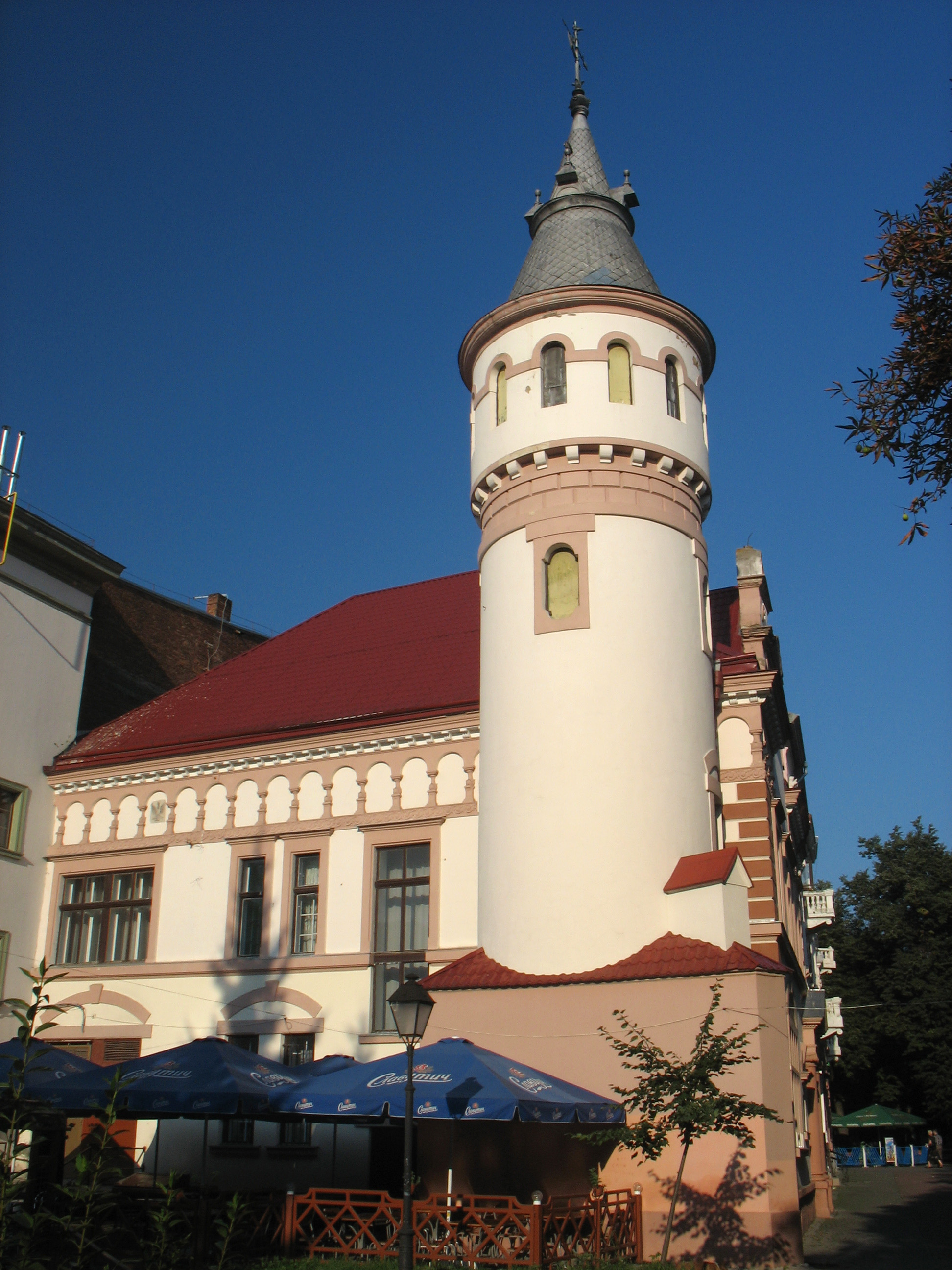
House of Sokol Sport Association, 1895

Ivano-Frankivsk is home to a number of sports teams. Most notably, it was home to the football club FC Spartak Ivano-Frankivsk (Prykarpattya) that participated on the national level since the 1950s. Since 2007, the club only fields its youth team Spartak-93 and competes in the Children-Youth Football League of Ukraine. The former president of Spartak Anatoliy Revutskiy reorganized the local university (University of Oil and Gas) team in 2007 into the new "FSK Prykarpattia" with support of the city mayor Anushkevychus making it the main football club in the region and replacing Spartak. Previously during the interbellum period, the city was home to another football club based on the local Polish garrison and called Rewera Stanisławów (1908). That club competed at a regional level that had evolved at that period. With the start of World War II, that club was disbanded. During the Soviet period among several others there was another club "Elektron" that successfully participated at a regional level around the 1970s.

The city also is the home to a futsal team, PFC Uragan Ivano-Frankivsk, that competes in the Ukrainian Futsal Championship. They were the Ukrainian champions having won the 2010/11 season playoffs and therefore took part in the 2011–12 UEFA Futsal Cup for the first time.

The city had an ice hockey team, HC Vatra Ivano-Frankivsk, which previously played in the Ukrainian Hockey Championship.

Ivano-Frankivsk is also the hometown of Ukrainian gymnasts; one of them is Dariya Zgoba who won gold on the uneven bars in the 2007 European Championships and became a finalist on the Beijing Olympics; the other one is Yana Demyanchuk, who won gold on the balance beam at the 2009 European Championships.

Other clubs include:

- Hoverla Ivano-Frankivsk (basketball)
- Roland Ivano-Frankivsk (rugby)
- Uragan (futsal)

Main Stadiums and Sport Complexes

- MCS Rukh, a sport complex consisting of the major arena and two auxiliary fields next to it
- Yunist Stadium (Youth)
- Hirka Stadium, property of the Ivano-Frankivsk Locomotive Maintenance Plant
- Nauka Stadium (Science), which belongs to Vasyl Stefanyk Precarpathian National University
- Stadium of Oil and Gas University
- Sport-Recreational Center "Tsunami", which contains an ice arena for the local hockey events and a waterpark

== City's radio, television, press media ==
Press

- "Reporter" – Ivano-Frankivsk weekly
- "Halytskyi Korespondent" – a social-political weekly
- "Halychyna" – regional newspaper

Radio

- "Zakhidnyi Polius (104.3 FM)" – city's radio
- "Vezha (107 FM)" – city's radio

Television

- "Ivano-Frankivsk ODTRK" – regional state broadcasting company
- "3-Studia" – regional broadcasting company
- "Halychyna" – regional television
- "Canal 402" - regional television

== Notable people ==
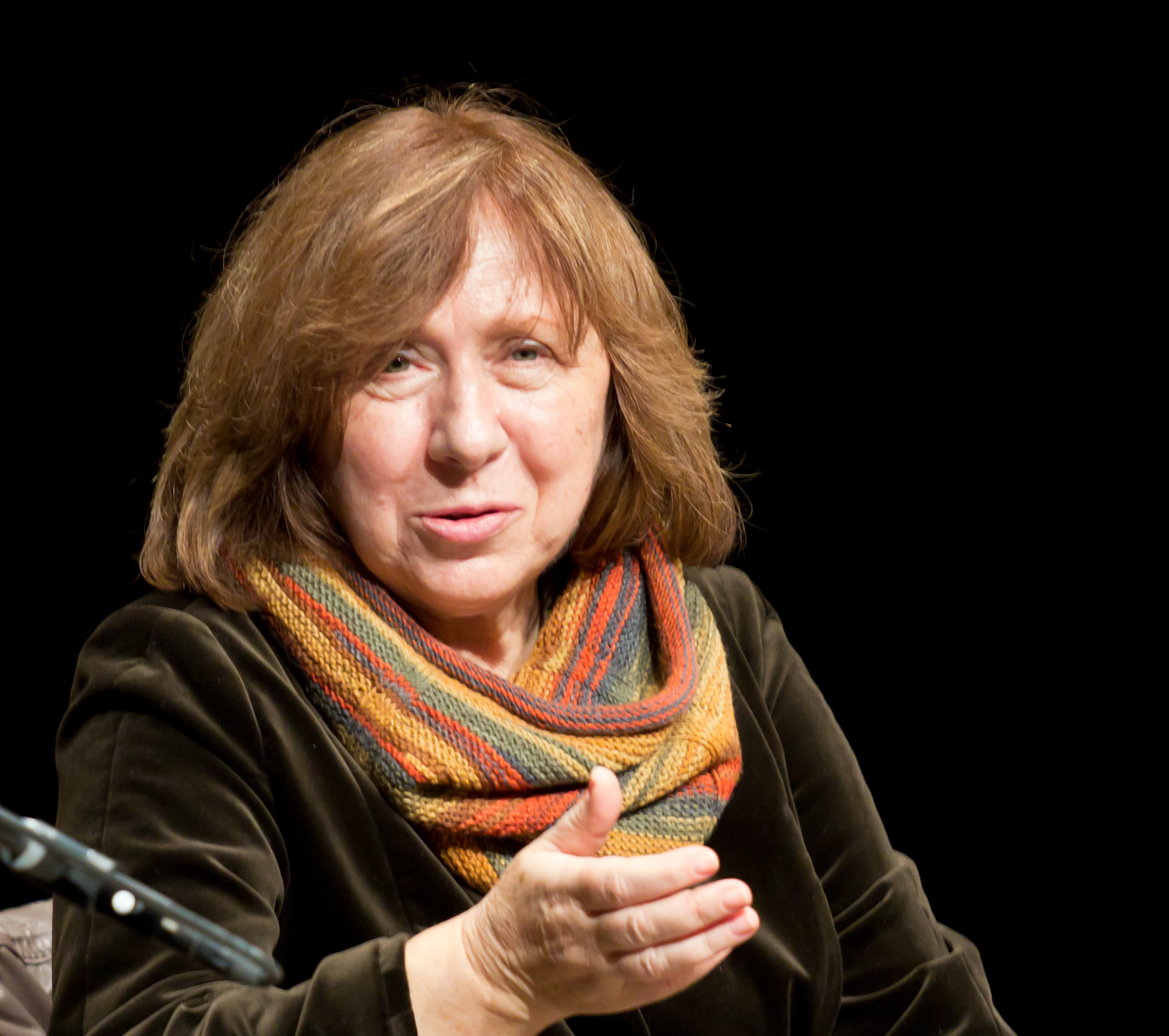
Svetlana Alexievich, 2013

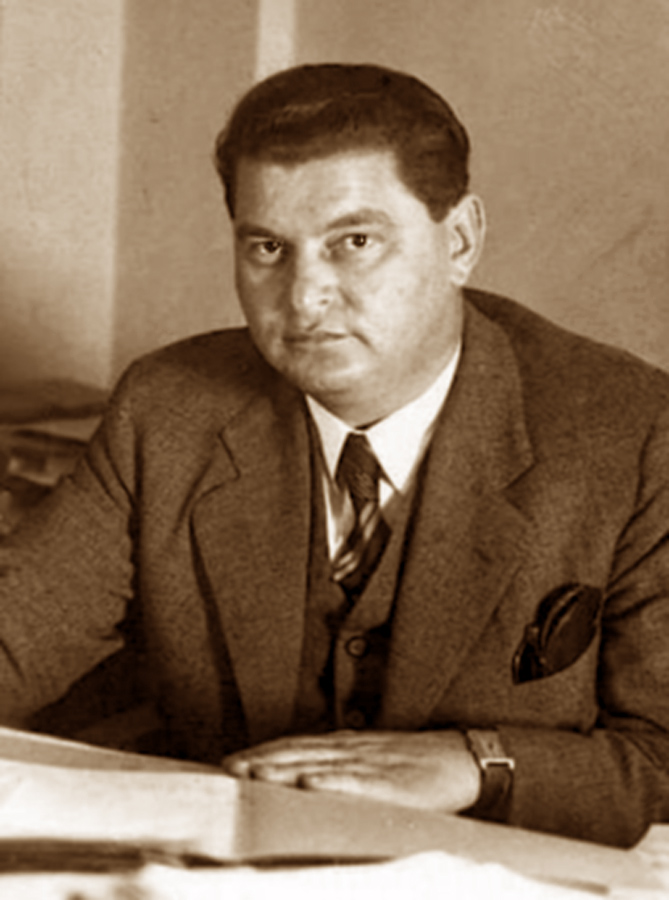
Daniel Auster, 1949

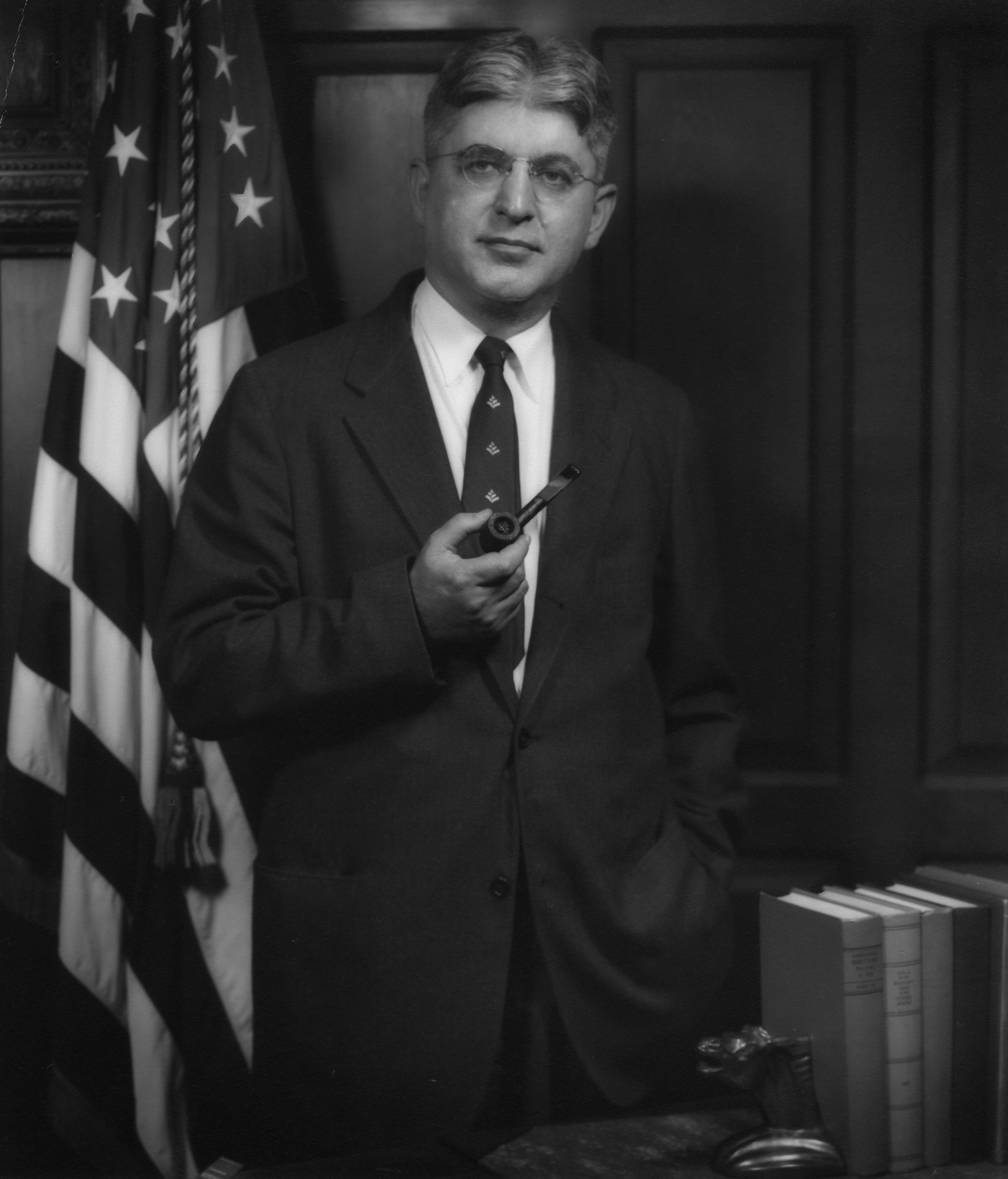
Arthur F. Burns, 1955

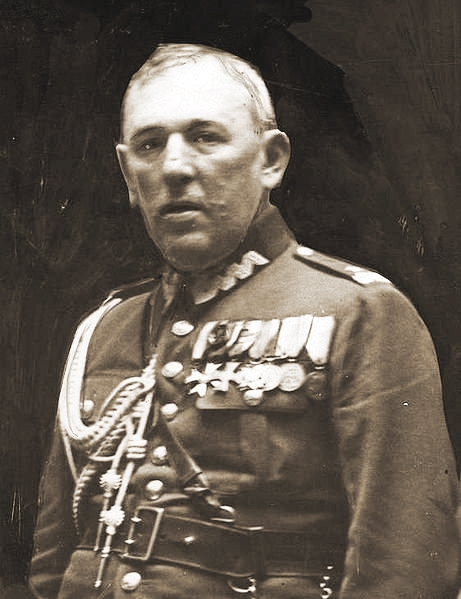
Bernard Mond, ca.1935

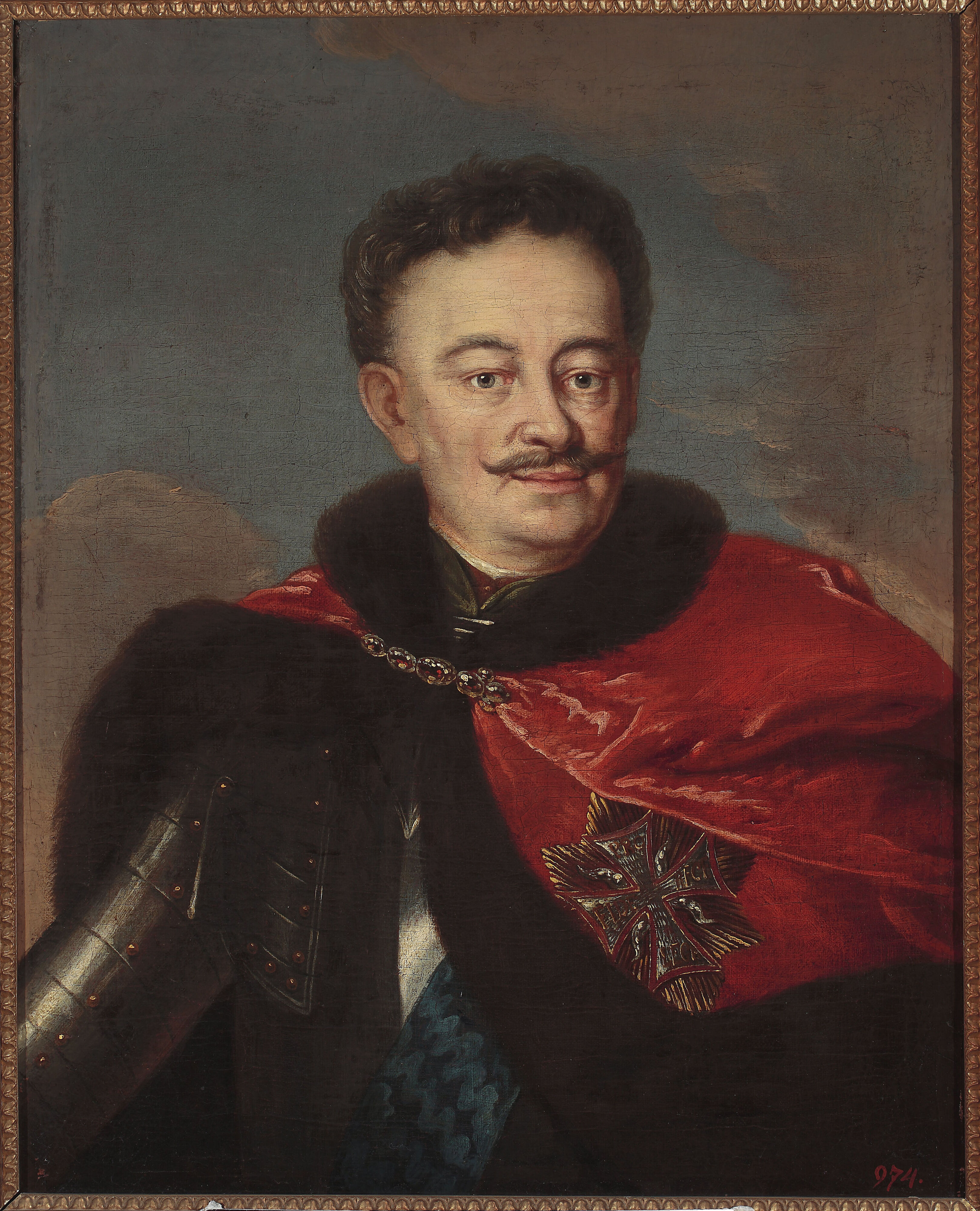
Portrait of Józef Potocki

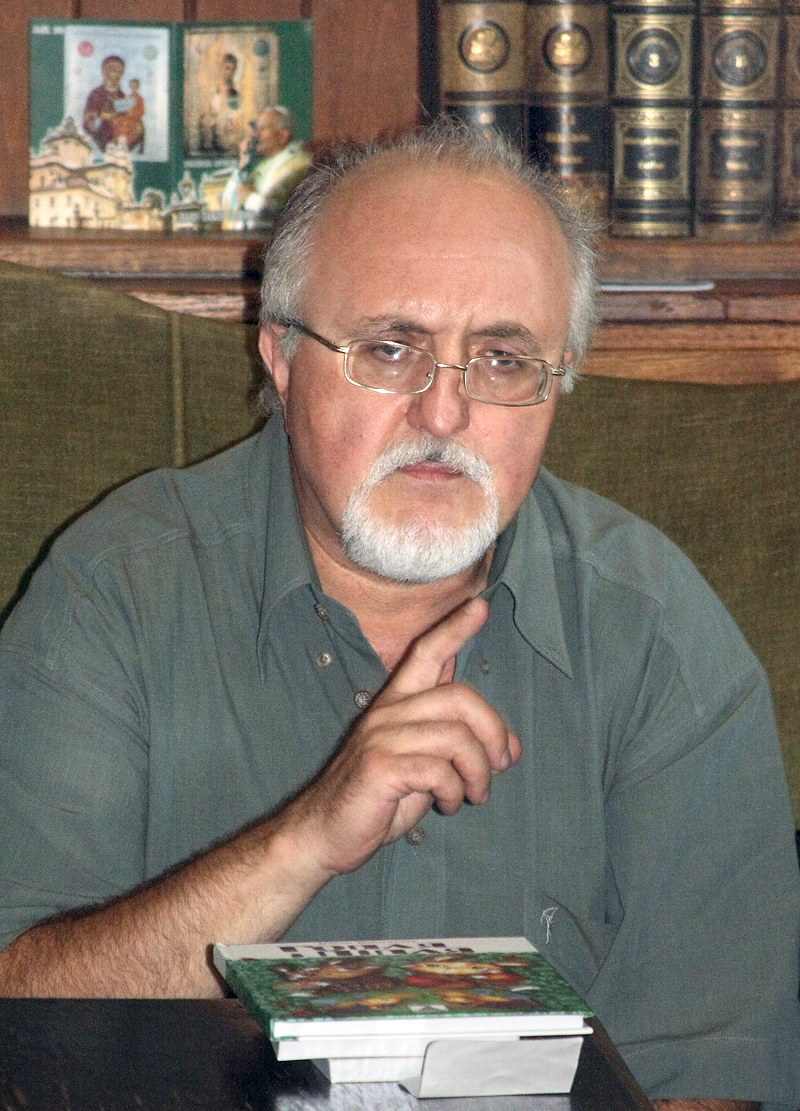
Yuriy Vynnychuk

- Eliezer Adler (1866–1949), founder of the Jewish Community in Gateshead, England
- Svetlana Alexievich (born 1948), Belarusian journalist and writer, winner of the 2015 Nobel Prize for Literature
- Yuri Andrukhovych (born 1960), Ukrainian writer
- Daniel Auster (1893–1963), Mayor of Jerusalem
- Menachem Avidom (1908–1995), Israeli composer
- John Banner (1910–1973), Austrian-American actor. Star of Hogan's Heroes
- Naftali Blumenthal (1922–2022), Israeli Member of the Knesset
- Maxim Bugzester (1909–1978), Polish painter
- Arthur F. Burns (1904–1987), American-Jewish economist and politician
- Yaroslav Huzar (1897–1963), Ukrainian public figure, father of Liubomyr Huzar
- Ana Casares (1930–2007), Polish-Argentine actress
- Zbigniew Cybulski (1927–1967), Polish actor
- Bolesław Wieniawa-Długoszowski (1881–1942), Polish general, politician and diplomat
- Albin Dunajewski (1817–1894), Roman Catholic cardinal
- Wiktor Eckhaus (1930–2000), Polish–Dutch mathematician
- Feliks Falk (born 1941), Polish film director
- Moshe Flimann (1905–1973), Mayor of Haifa
- Fritz Grossmann (1902–1984), art historian and Professor of Art History
- Ludwik Hass (1918–2008), Polish historian
- Moses Horowitz (1844–1910), playwright and actor of Yiddish theatre
- Alfred Johann Theophil Jansa von Tannenau (1884–1963), Austrian general
- GreenJolly (active 2004–2005), Ukrainian rap band
- Tina Karol (born 1985), Ukrainian singer, actress, and television presenter
- Orest-Vasyl Kuziv (born 1997), Ukrainian artist
- Maria Antonina Kratochwil (1881–1942), nun beatified by Pope John Paul II who tried to save Jews during the Holocaust
- František Kriegel (1908—1979), Czechoslovak politician and physician
- Manfred H. Lachs (1914–1993), Polish diplomat and British jurist
- Oksana Lada (born 1976), Ukrainian actress
- Chaim David Lippe (1823–1900), Austrian Jewish publisher and bibliographer
- Alfreda Markowska (1926–2021), Polish-Romani woman who during World War II saved approximately 50 Jewish and Roma children from death in the Holocaust and the Porajmos genocide
- Leo Aryeh Mayer (1895–1959), Israeli scholar of Islamic art and rector of the Hebrew University of Jerusalem
- Bernard Mond (1887–1957), Jewish general of the Polish Army
- Itzhak Nener (1919–2012), Israeli jurist
- Yevhen Nakonechny (1931–2006), Ukrainian historian, librarian, library scientist, and linguist
- Nadia Parfan (born 1986), Ukrainian film director and creative producer
- Daniel Passent (1938–2022), Polish journalist
- Anastasiya Petryshak (born 1994), Ukrainian violinist
- Józef Potocki (1673–1751), Polish nobleman, son of the Polish founder of the city
- Mikhail Prusak (1960–2025), Russian politician
- Bohdan Rozvadovskyi (born 2004), better known by his stage name SadSvit, Ukrainian post punk singer
- Horacy Safrin (1899–1980), Polish poet, comedian, author, and translator
- Max Schur (1897–1969), physician
- Anna Seniuk (born 1942), Polish actress
- Tryzuby Stas (1948–2007), Ukrainian singer and writer of humorous songs, bard
- Klemens Stefan Sielecki (1903–1980), Polish engineer and technical director of Fablok
- Stanisław Sosabowski (1892–1967), Polish general, hero of Arnhem
- Jan Stopyra (1934–2023), politician and economist, mayor of Szczecin, Poland
- Mordechai Surkis (1908–1995), Israeli politician
- Gabriel Talphir (1901–1990), Israeli poet, art critic, publisher, editor, and translator
- Vasyl Velychkovsky (1903–1973), bishop of Ukrainian Greek Catholic Church
- Taras Voznyak (born 1957), Ukrainian political scientist, editor-in-chief and founder of Independent Cultural Journal
- Yuriy Vynnychuk (born 1952), Ukrainian author
- Alexander Wagner (1868–1942), Polish chess theoretician
- Ksenia Zsikhotska (born 1989), Ukrainian dancer

=== Sport ===
- Yana Demyanchuk (born 1993), Ukrainian gymnast and 2009 European Champion on balance beam
- Myroslav Stupar (born 1941), Ukrainian football referee
- Vasyl Virastyuk (born 1974), Ukrainian strongman athlete 2004 World's Strongest Man

== Twin towns – sister cities ==
Ivano-Frankivsk is twinned with:

- Arlington County, United States (2009)
- Braga, Portugal (2017)
- Brest, Belarus
- Chrzanów, Poland (2001)
- Chrzanów County, Poland (2016)
- Jelgava, Latvia (2007)
- Koszalin, Poland (2010)
- Lublin, Poland (2009)
- Nanning, China (2019)
- Nowa Sól County, Poland (2010)
- Ochota (Warsaw), Poland (2006)
- Opole, Poland (2005)
- Potsdam, Germany (2023)
- Přerov, Czech Republic (2010)
- Diyarbakır, Turkey (2023)
- (Georgia (country)) Rustavi, Georgia (2016)
- Rybnik, Poland (2001)
- Rzeszów, Poland (2000)
- Strășeni District, Moldova (2016)
- Świdnica, Poland (2008)
- Tomaszów Mazowiecki, Poland (2004)
- Trakai, Lithuania (2006)
- Zielona Góra, Poland (2001)

In February 2016 Ivano-Frankivsk City Council terminated its twinned relations with the Russian cities Surgut, Serpukhov and Veliky Novgorod due to the Russo-Ukrainian War.

=== Partner cities ===
Ivano-Frankivsk cooperates with:

- Baia Mare, Romania (1990)
- Nyíregyháza, Hungary (2004)
- Oradea, Romania (2003)
- Târgoviște, Romania (2005)

== Orientation ==
Local orientation

Regional orientation

== See also ==
- Dem'ianiv Laz

== Sources ==
- "Endure, Defy and Remember", by Joachim Nachbar, 1977
- Evans, Andrew (1 March 2007). Ukraine: The Bradt Travel Guide. Bradt Travel Guides. ISBN 978-1-84162-181-4.
- "False papers: deception and survival in the Holocaust", by Robert Melson, Univ. of Illinois Press, 2000. Dr. Melson is a professor of political science at Purdue, whose grandfather owned the Mendelsohn factory in Stanislawow.
- "I'm not even a grown up, the diary of Jerzy Feliks Urman", translated by Anthony Rudolf and Joanna Voit, ed. by Anthony Rudolf. London: Menard Press, 1991. 11-yr old in Stanislaw commits suicide to avoid capture by Nazis.
- "Living Longer than Hate", by C.S. Ragsdale
- Mokotoff, Gary; Amdur Sack, Sallyann; Sharon, Alexander (November 2002). Where once we walked: a guide to the Jewish communities destroyed in the Holocaust. Avotaynu. ISBN 978-1-886223-15-8.
