= Stanisław Potocki =

Stanisław Potocki may refer to:

- Stanisław "Rewera" Potocki, 1579–1667, hetman, voivode, podkomorzy,
- Stanisław Potocki (1659-1683), son of Andrzej Potocki
- Stanisław Potocki (died 1760), voivode
- Stanisław Szczęsny Potocki (1753–1805), voivode, Artillery General
- Stanisław Potocki (1782–1831), Russian commander in the Patriotic War of 1812, son of Stanisław Szczęsny
- Stanisław Kostka Potocki (1755–1821), podstoli, Artillery General
- Stanisław Florian Potocki (1766–1830), general
- Stanisław Antoni Potocki (1837–1884)

== See also ==
- Aleksander Stanisław Potocki (1778–1845) castellan
- Potocki family
