= Agnieszka Truskolaska =

Polish actress, opera singer and theatre director

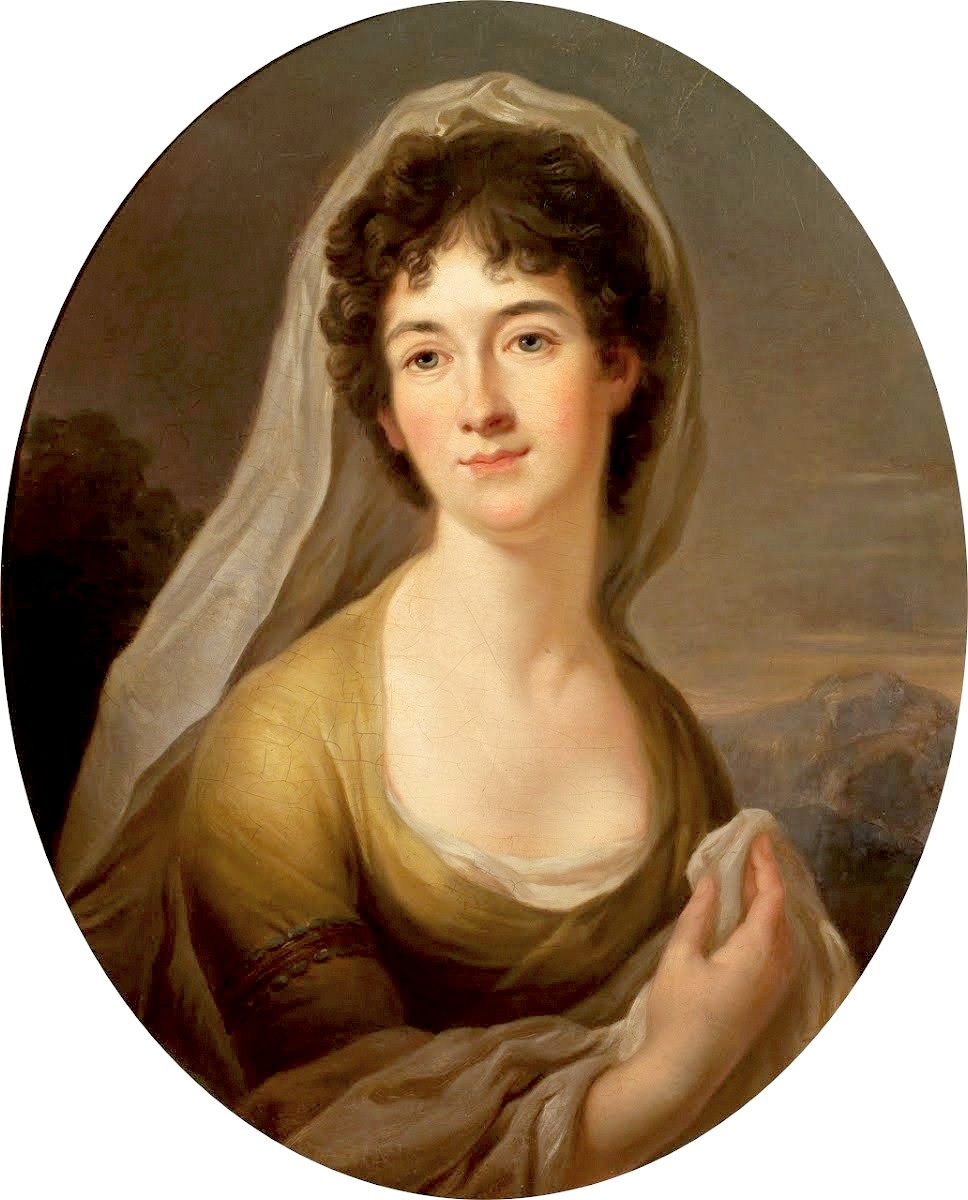
- Painting of Agnieszka Truskolaska by Marceli Bacciarelli
- Born: 1755; Polish-Lithuanian Commonwealth, Masovian Voivodeship, Warsaw
- Died: October 30, 1831 (aged 75–76); Congress Poland, Kaliskie Voivodeship, Kalisz

Agnieszka Marianna Truskolaska (1755 – 30 November 1831) was a Polish actress, opera singer and theatre director. She was one of the most admired female artists of her time in Poland.

Agnieszka Truskolaska was born in Warsaw, and was one of the first female stars of the Polish theatre. When the first Polish-speaking theatre opened with Polish actors of both genders in 1765, there was a severe shortage of female actors. The first Polish actresses were Wiktoria Leszczyńska and Antonina Prusinowska, who took part in the first play and ran the theatre in 1765–67 before they could retire with a great pension.

Truskolaska married Thomas Truskolaski, actor and director of a theatre troupe, in 1770, and was active in his troupe from 1774. She debuted at the theatre in Warsaw as an actress in 1777 and as a singer in 1779. In 1780–83, she founded and managed a theatre in Lwów with her spouse and the actor Kazimierz Owsiński, before they returned to the capital, where they often performed at the National Theatre, Warsaw. In the 1790s, she was a star on the stage of the national theatre in Warsaw. As a widow, she managed her late husband's theatre troupe in 1797–99.

Her daughter also became a known actress, excelling in tragedy. In 1803 she gave up her career as an actress. Her most memorable performances were: Mérope (1792) and Horace (1802).
