= Lachowski =

Nałęcz coat of arms used by some of Lachowski family

Lachowski (feminine: Lachowska) is a Polish surname. Some of them use: Janina, Łodzia, Nałęcz, Pilawa or Ślepowron coat of arms. The East-Slavic equivalent is Lyakhovsky. Notable people with the surname include:

- Francisco Lachowski (born 1991), Brazilian model
- Jadwiga Lachowska (1892–1962) also known as Aga Lahowska-Mundell, Polish operatic soprano and mezzo-soprano
- Michael Lachowski, American musician
- Sławomir Lachowski (born 1958), Polish banker

== See also ==
- Lechowski
