= Stanisław Potocki (starost of Halicz) =

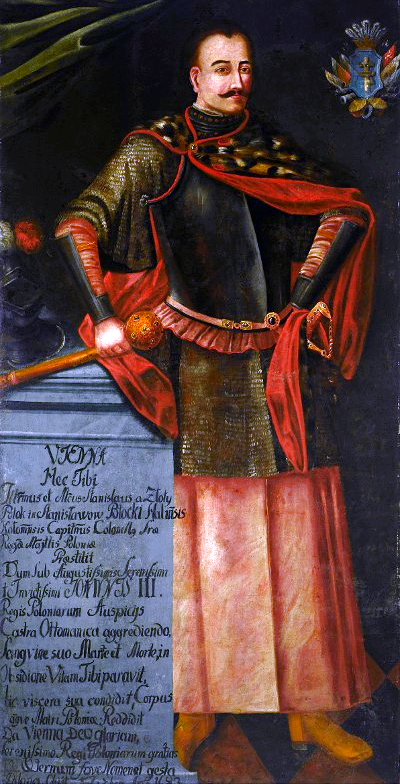
- Coat of arms: Piława
- Born: 1659
- Died: September 12, 1683 (aged 23–24); Vienna
- Family: Potocki
- Father: Andrzej Potocki
- Mother: Anna Rysińska

Stanisław Potocki hr. Piława (Polish pronunciation: [pɔˈtɔt͡skʲi], 1659 – September 12, 1683 at the Battle of Vienna), was a Polish noble, starost of Halicz and Kołomyja, rotmistrz and pułkownik of cavalry. Son of Hetman Andrzej Potocki and brother of Hetman Józef Potocki. He died at the age of around 24.

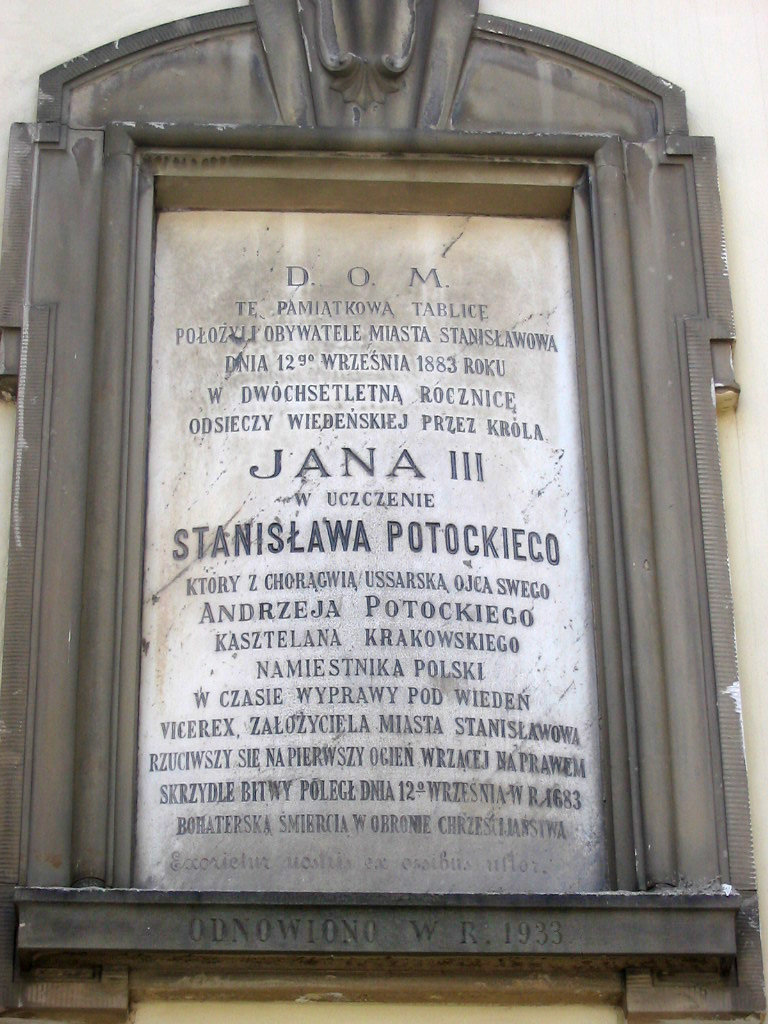
A Memorial Plate in Polish in Stanisławów (now Ivano-Frankivsk, Ukraine)

He is buried in the Collegiate Church of Stanisławów (now Ivano-Frankivsk) but his heart remained in Vienna and was buried in the Franciscan Church.

== Bibliography ==
- (in Polish) Polski Słownik Biograficzny t. 28 s. 153
