= Coat of arms of Ivano-Frankivsk =

Symbol of Ivano-Frankivsk, Ukraine

Versions
- The Great Coat of Arms of Ivano Frankivsk
- Armiger: Ivano-Frankivsk
- Adopted: 17 February 1995; 31 years ago
- Crest: Golden Stone Triple tower
- Torse: none
- Shield: traditional Iberian
- Supporters: black jackdaws, crowned
- Compartment: none

Coat of arms of Ivano-Frankivsk (Ukrainian: Герб Івано-Франківська) is an official symbol of the Ivano-Frankivsk city. The current one was adopted on 17 February 1995.

== Former coat of arms ==
City emblem during the Second Polish Republic

The Polish city emblem was adopted at a session of the city council on 10 March 1938, and published on 24 May 1938. It was composed of a modern French escutcheon Gules depicting an Argent castle with three towers and an open city gate. Inside the gate was depicted the Piława coat of arms, the Potocki family symbol.
