= Stanisław Potocki (voivode of Poznań) =

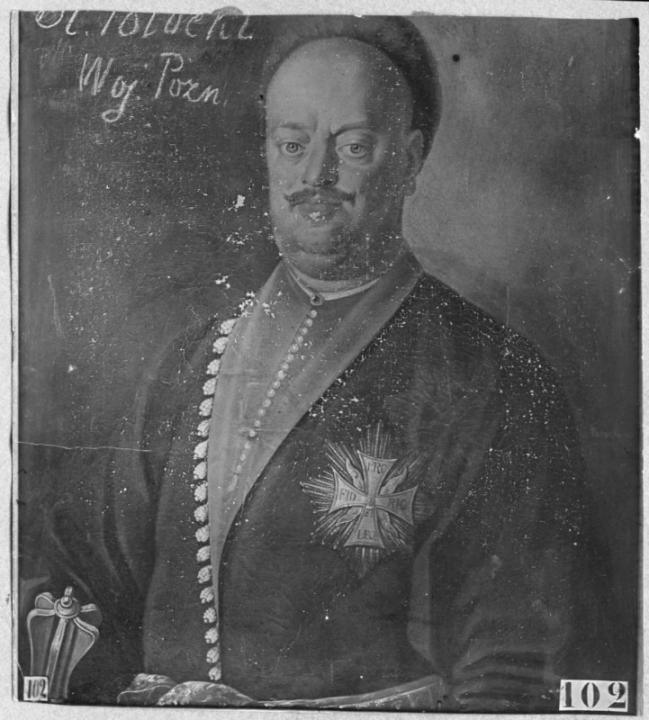
- Stanislaw Potocki WK (1698-1760)
- Coat of arms: Piława
- Born: 18th century
- Died: 1760
- Noble family: Potocki
- Spouses: Marianna Łaszcz; Helena Zamoyska
- Father: Józef Potocki
- Mother: Wiktoria Leszczyńska

Stanisław Potocki (Polish pronunciation: [pɔˈtɔt͡skʲi]; died 1760) was a Polish nobleman (szlachcic).

Potocki was Grand Guard of the Crown from 1728, voivode of Smolensk Voivodeship from 1735 to 1744, voivode of Kiev Voivodeship from 1744 to 1756, voivode of Poznań Voivodeship from 1756, starost of Halicz (now Halych), Kolomyia, and Sniatyn. He received the Knighthood of the Order of the White Eagle, awarded on August 3, 1742.

He was married to Marianna Łaszcz and they had two children, Antoni Potocki (born before 1734) and Anna Elżbieta Potocka. He was later married to Helena Zamoyska with whom he had ten more children: Józef Potocki, Piotr Potocki, Franciszek Ksawery Potocki, Wincenty Potocki, Wiktoria Potocka, Ludwika Potocka, Ignacy Potocki (1746-?), Michał Potocki, Ksawery Potocki and Teofilia Potocka.
