= Józef Potocki =

Polish noble (1673–1751)

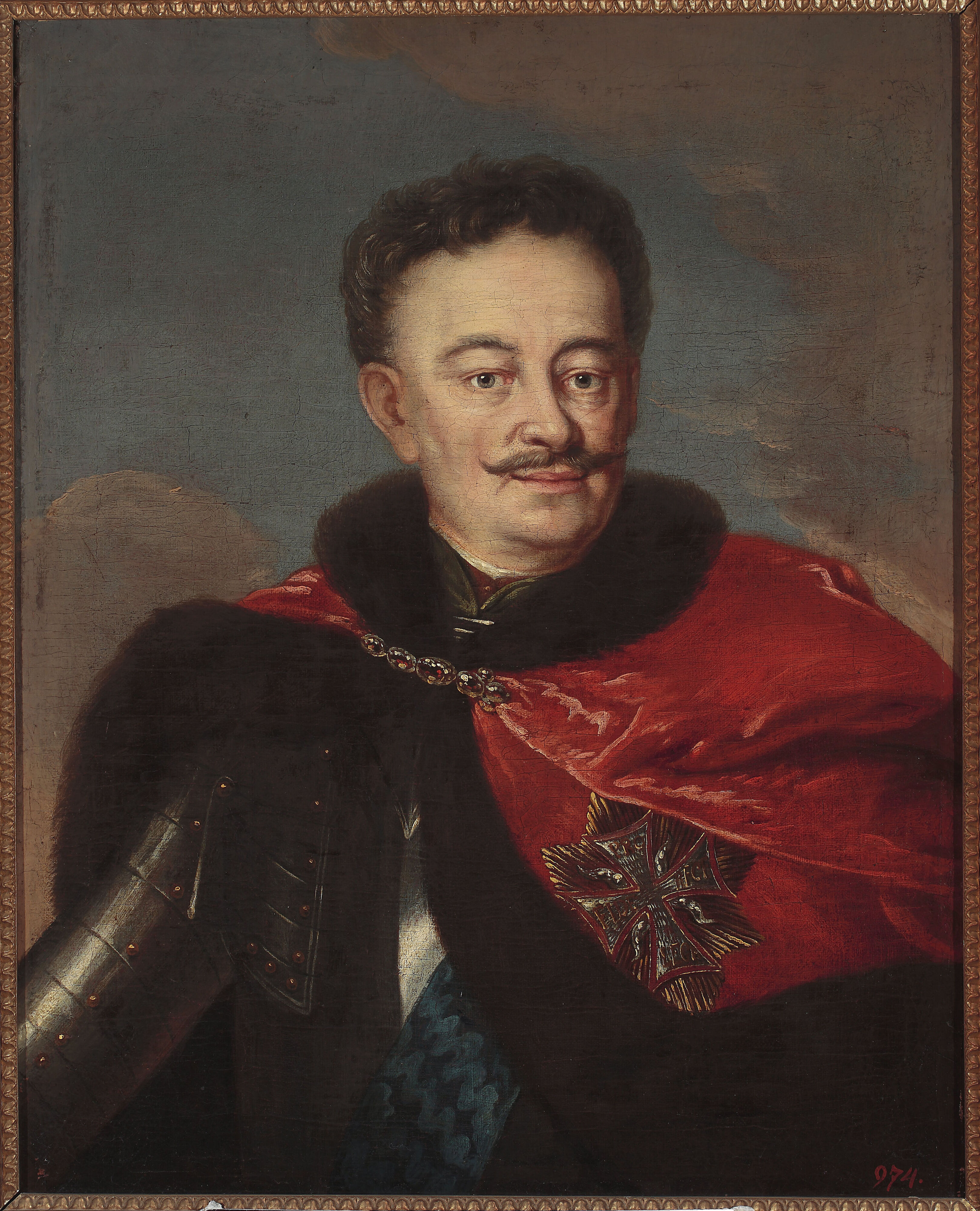
- Coat of arms: Piława
- Born: 1673; Stanisławów
- Died: 19 May 1751; Założce
- Family: Potocki
- Consort: Wiktoria Leszczyńska; Ludwika Mniszek
- Issue: with Wiktoria Leszczyńska; Zofia Potocka; Stanisław Potocki
- Father: Andrzej Potocki
- Mother: Anna Rysińska

Józef Potocki (Polish pronunciation: [ˈjuzɛf pɔˈtɔt͡skʲi]; 1673 – 19 May 1751) was a Polish nobleman (szlachcic), magnate, Great Hetman of the Crown.

== Early life ==
Potocki was born in Stanisławów in 1673. He was a son of Andrzej Potocki and Anna Rysińska.

== Career ==
Józef was considered as the richest magnate in Poland at that time. He was Voivode of Kijów Voivodship (Kyiv, also Kiev) from 1702 to 1744, Regimentarz generalny of the Crown Army since 1733, Great Crown Hetman since 1735, voivod of Poznań Voivodship since 1743, castellan of Kraków since 1748 and starost of Halicz, Warsaw, Leżajsk, Kołomyja, Czerwonogród, Śniatyn and Bolemów.

In 1703 he suppressed a peasant revolt led by Semen Paliy in Ukraine. He was originally a supporter of King August II of Poland but in 1705 he changed sides and became a supporter of King Stanisław I Leszczyński.

Józef was defeated at the battles of Kalisz 1706 and Koniecpol in 1708 and since 1709 after the Battle of Poltava he lived in exile in Hungary and Turkey. In 1714 he came back to Poland and became together with Teodor Potocki, the leader of the opposition to the "Familia" and the royal court. As part of this opposition, he contributed to the breaking-up of 9 sejms and prevented an increase of the army.

In 1733 during the War of the Polish Succession he again supported Stanisław I Leszczyński. He became a regimentarz of the Confederation of Dzików and guided the Polish confederate army against Russian and Saxon forces in several battles. On 28 February 1735 he recognized August III as King of Poland, becoming the Grand Hetman of the Crown, but conspired against him and the royal court with Turkey, Sweden and Prussia.

In 1719 he was granted the Order of the White Eagle, the highest decoration in Poland, and in 1742 became a chevalier of the Russian Orders of St. Andrew and St. Alexander Nevsky.

== Personal life ==
Potocki was twice married, first to Wiktoria Leszczyńska. Together, they were the parents of: Zofia Potocka and Stanisław Potocki. After her death, he married Ludwika Mniszek.

Potocki died in Założce on 19 May 1751.
