= Andrzej Potocki =

Polish noble (1630–1691)

- Field Crown Hetman
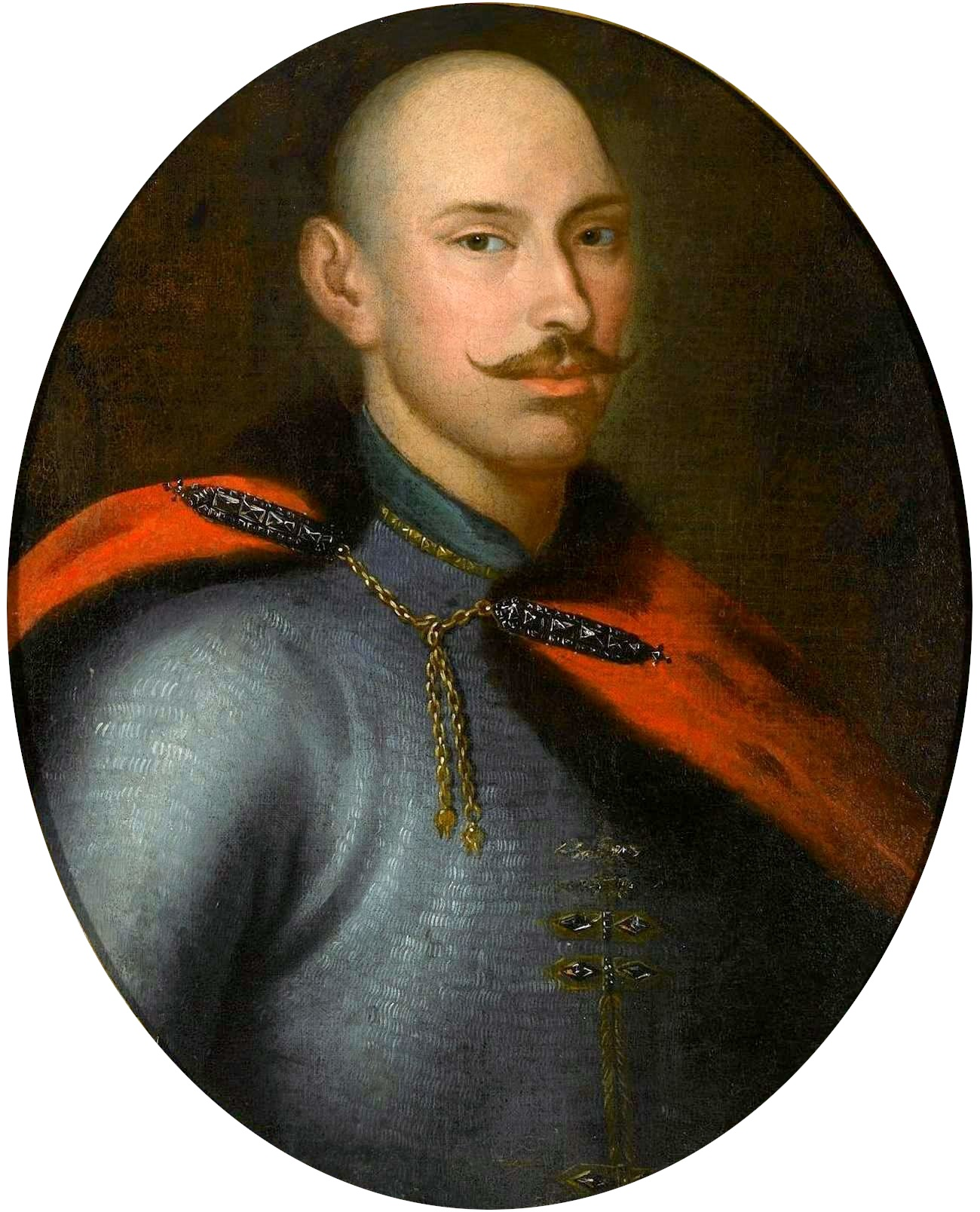
- Portrait, c. 1680
- Coat of arms: Piława
- Born: ca. 1630; Stanisławów, Poland
- Died: 30 August 1691; Stanisławów, Poland
- Family: Potocki
- Spouse: Anna Rysińska
- Issue: Katarzyna Potocka; Stanisław Potocki; Józef Potocki
- Father: Stanisław "Rewera" Potocki
- Mother: Zofia Kalinowska

Andrzej Potocki (Polish pronunciation: [ˈandʐɛj pɔˈtɔt͡skʲi]; 1630 – 30 August 1691) was a Polish nobleman, magnate, politician, general and military commander. He held a number of political and military positions and was a skilled commander and successfully protected the Eastern Borderlands of the Polish–Lithuanian Commonwealth from the invading armies of Ottoman Turkey, Cossacks and Tatars.

== Biography ==
Andrzej Potocki was the son of Hetman Stanisław "Rewera" Potocki. In 1660 he became the Great Chorąży of the Crown and later the voivode of Kiev Voivodship (from 1668) and voivode of Kraków Voivodship (from 1682). He distinguished himself in the battle of Khotyn, where he commanded the left wing of the royal army (1673). After the abdication of John II Casimir in 1668, he strongly supported the candidacy of the Tsarevich Feodor, for which he was disliked by other nobles. He was a member of the Confederation of Malcontents in 1672. He participated in the Battle of Khotyn in 1673. Potocki later was one of the electors of John III Sobieski, representing the Kiev province in 1674, although he opposed the pro-French and anti-Brandenburgian policies of the king. In 1675 he was responsible for defeating the Tatars at the battle of Kałusz. In 1680 Potocki was appointed the governor of Kraków and subsequently the Kraków castellan in 1682. In 1683 during an expedition to Vienna, Potocki was nominated as the chief ruler of the Polish–Lithuanian Commonwealth, while Sobieski was absent. Potocki successfully conducted warfare in the south-eastern parts of the country, known as Podolia, and regained large parts of the land (including Niemirów) from the Turks. For this, in 1684, he was appointed the Field Crown Hetman. He later took part in the unsuccessful expeditions against Moldavia in 1685. He was also starost of Halicz, Wyszogród, Leżajsk, Śniatyń, Kołomyja, Mościsk and Medyka.

After his death in 1691, Potocki was buried in the city of Stanisławów (named after his father), where he founded a new catholic collegiate church. His remains were desecrated and thrown out of the tomb, during the planned destruction of the church by Ukrainian communists after 1963.

== Bibliography ==
- Polski Słownik Biograficzny t. 27 s. 773

== See also ==
- Ivano-Frankivsk (formerly Stanisławów)
- Stanisław "Rewera" Potocki
- House of Potocki
- Szlachta
