= Stanisław Rewera Potocki =

Polish noble, magnate and military leader

Hetman Stanisław Rewera Potocki
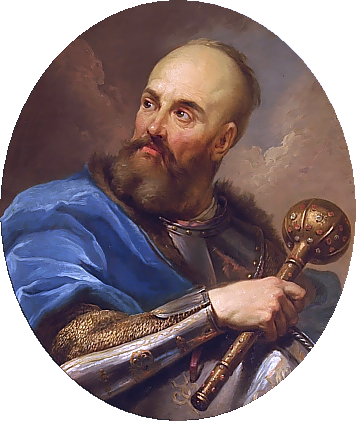
- Coat of arms: Piława
- Born: 1589; Podhajce, Polish-Lithuanian Commonwealth (modern-day Pidhaitsi, Ukraine)
- Died: 27 February 1667 (aged 77–78); Podhajce, Polish-Lithuanian Commonwealth
- Noble family: Potocki
- Spouses: Zofia Kalinowska; Anna Mohyła
- Issue: Andrzej Potocki; Feliks Kazimierz Potocki; Wiktoria Elżbieta Potocka; Anna Potocka; Prokop Potocki
- Father: Andrzej Potocki
- Mother: Zofia Piasecka

Stanisław Rewera Potocki (Polish pronunciation: [pɔˈtɔt͡skʲi]; 1589 – 27 February 1667) was a Polish noble, magnate and military leader. Together with Stefan Czarniecki he was successful in defending the Commonwealth against the invading Swedes and Russians during The Deluge. He was the most trusted advisor of King John II Casimir.

== Biography ==
=== Early life ===
Initially a lukewarm member of the Polish Reformed Church, under the influence of Jesuits and his first wife he converted from Calvinism to Catholicism. Potocki was married to Zofia Kalinowska and Anna Mohyła. After careful studies at home and abroad (mostly in France and in the Netherlands) he began his great military career by fighting the rebels with his father and uncles on the side of King Sigismund III at the Battle of Guzów. He then took part in an expedition to Wallachia and in the siege of Smolensk in 1611, during the Polish-Russian war. He also fought at Cecora (1620) and Chocim (1621). He took part in the war with Sweden (1626–1629) temporarily replacing Stanisław Koniecpolski, and suffered a major defeat at Górzno in 1629. He fought the rebellious Cossacks in the years 1637–1638.

=== Military career ===
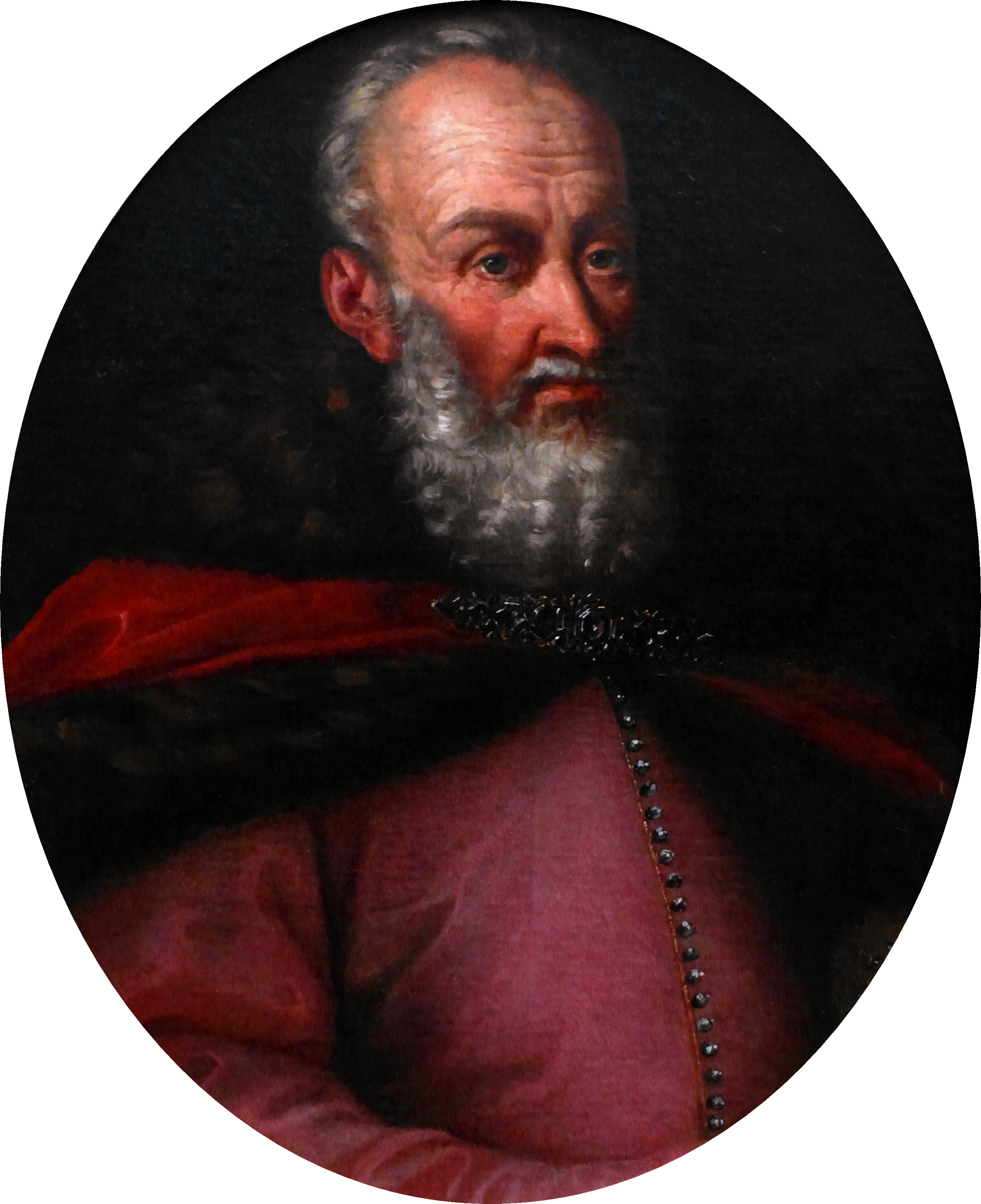
Anonymous, 17th-century portrait of Potocki

He was the podkomorzy (Chamberlain) of Podolia from 1621, castellan of Kamieniec Podolski from 1628, and voivod of the Bratslav Voivodeship from 1631 and the Podolia voivodeship from 1636. Potocki became Field Crown Hetman in 1652 and Great Crown Hetman in 1654. He was voivod of Kiev Voivodship from 1655 and voivod of Kraków Voivodship from 1658. Potocki was also Starost of Halych, Radom, Krasnystaw, Ropczyce, Medyka, Bar, Grodziec, Kolomyia, Mostyska, Drahimów, Letychiv and Dolina.

He was the Elector of King Władysław IV representing the Bratslav province in 1632. He was also the Elector of King John II Casimir in 1648 from the province of Podolia. During the Khmelnytsky Uprising, it is believed that Potocki saved the king's life near the town of Zborów. In 1652, he was appointed the Field Hetman of the Commonwealth, and two years later, he commanded the Polish army against the Russians and Cossacks. In 1655, he fought and won the Battle of Ochmatów. In the same year, he was nominated as the voivode of Kyiv. After the invasion of the Swedish army during the Deluge, he was permanently commanding the army in the East, but did not engage against the Swedes. After the defeat of the Russian-Cossack army under Gródek (today Horodok), Potocki was forced to surrender to King Charles X Gustav. He later joined the confederation at Tyszowce. In the 1656–1660 campaigns, Potocki was not the supreme commander of the entire forces of the Crown; he did have control over his division, which took part in the battles. He was one of the Hetmans who participated in the Battle of Warsaw in 1656. In 1657, he fought victoriously with George II Rákóczi, and took part in the pinning of his troops near Czarny Ostrów. In 1660, acting jointly with Jerzy Sebastian Lubomirski, Potocki was victorious over the Russian army led by Vasyl Sheriemietiev, forcing him to surrender at Cudnów. The last time he fought was against the Lubomirski rebels, suffering a defeat at Częstochowa in 1665. During his entire military career, he participated in 46 battles.

=== Death ===
Potocki died on 27 February 1667 and was buried in the Church of the Holy Trinity in Podhajce.

The nickname "Rewera" was given to Stanisław Potocki because of his frequent use of Latin words re vera (meaning 'in fact').

In his honour, his son, the future Hetman of the Crown Andrzej Potocki, founded in 1662 the city-fortress of Stanisławów (later Ivano-Frankivsk).

== Legacy ==
- Stanisławów (former name of the city of Ivano-Frankivsk)
- Rewera Stanisławów – Polish football team
