= Lechowski =

Lechowski is a Polish surname. Notable people with the surname include:

- Przemysław Lechowski (born 1977), Polish classical pianist
- Rafael Lechowski (born 1985), Spanish rapper born in Poland
