= Pilawa coat of arms =

Polish coat of arms

Pilawa
- Battle cry: Pilawa
- Alternative names: Pilawa, Strzała
- Earliest mention: 1385
- Cities: Baltiysk, former town of Piława, Buczacz, Monasterzyska, Jabłonów, Kozowa, Peczeniżyn, Tłuste (Tarnopil oblast), Suchostaw, Tyśmienica, Bodzanów, Złotniki, Stanisławów, Brody (Lviv oblast), Krystynopol (Lviv oblast), Czerwonogród (Tarnopil Oolast), Horodenka
- Gminas: Gmina Krzeszowice, Gmina Nałęczów
- Families: 160 names Antypowicz, Balcer, Baszmanowski, Batulewicz, Błędowski, Bogdaszewski, Boleścic, Borowski, Borszcożowski, Bortkiewicz, Bóbr, Buczacki, Buterlewicz, Butulewicz, Bystrzykowski, Bzowski, Charewicz, Charkowski, Chechelski, Chrzczonowski, Cieszkowski, Czeszkowski, Denewski, Denow, Dmitrowski, Dobromirski, Drozdowski, Dulowski, Dymitrowski, Felsztyn, Gąsiorowski, Grabowski, Groffik, Ilkusz, Janowski, Jerzewski, Jurkowicki, Jurkowicz, Jurkowiecki, Kamieniec, Kamieniecki, Kamieński, Kaminiec, Karliński, Kliczkowski, Klikowicz, Knot, Knoth, Kostecki, Kot, Kubiatowicz, Lachowicz, Lachowski, Lalowski, Lechiński, Lechowski, Lewicki, Lichiński, Lichnowski, Lutostański, Łabuszewski, Łachowski, Małyszewicz, Manasterski, Manastyrski, Marcinkowski, Mars, Masłowski, Miłkowski, Misiowski, Modzelewski, Monasterski, Moskarzowski, Moskorzewski, Murca, Mysiowski, Mysłowski, Mystkowski, Myszkowski, Myślkowski, Nagorski, Nagorzyński, Nagórski, Nagurski, Namieniecki, Niewiadowski, Niewodowski, Obertyński, Okieński, Okiński, Petrowicki, Pęczalski, Pęczelski, Piec, Piecewski, Piecowski, Pieczyski, Pierzyński, Pilawski, Piotrkowczyk, Piotrkowski, Piotrowicki, Piruski, Płatuść, Podfilipski, Podgajewski, Podgórski, Podhajecki, Pokutyński, Potocki, Przełubski, Przyłubski, Rawa, Rawski, Roskowski, Roszkowski, Rucki, Rudzki, Rutski, Rynkowski, Skaczkowski, Skałowski, Słostowski, Smalawski, Smalski, Solecki, Stanisławski, Stokowski, Stroiński, Sychowski, Szewiga, Szychowski, Światły, Święcicki, Twardowski, Twarowski, Tworowski, Warkulewicz, Warzyński, Waźliński, Ważyński, Wierzbicki, Wierzychowski, Wiesiołowski, Wietrychowski, Wietrzychowski, Wojsz, Wojsza, Zagorski, Zagórski, Zakliczewski, Zakliczowski, Zelisławski, Żak, Żakiewicz, Żarski, Żelisławski, Żelsławski, Żokiewicz, Żyrosław

Pilawa (Polish pronunciation: [piˈlava]) is a Polish coat of arms. It was used by many noble families known as szlachta in Polish in medieval Poland and later under the Polish–Lithuanian Commonwealth, branches of the original medieval Piława Clan (Pilawici) family as well as families connected with the Clan by adoption.

== History ==
The progenitor of the Pilawa Clan was supposed to have been Żyrosław z Potoka, who was fighting the Prussians, a pagan tribe and brought himself glory in the Battle of Piława, where he fought along Bolesław IV the Curly. The legend states that Żyrosław reached the pagan chief, fought him in hand-to-hand combat and killed him. The terrified enemy hordes fled the battle field. The related legend tells also that in 1166, to commemorate the victory, Bolesław IV bestowed a coat of arms upon Żyrosław, naming it for the place, where the battle took place.

== Blazon ==
The Pilawa coat of arms assumed its final form in the late 14th century. Formerly, there were two differing patterns, and the records from the years 1387, 1388 and 1389 mention that it had to be a letter "Z" with two and a half of a cross, or an arrow with two and a half of a cross.

== Notable bearers ==
Notable bearers of this coat of arms have included:

- House of Potocki
  - Mikołaj Potocki
  - Jan Potocki
  - Antoni Protazy Potocki
  - Roman Ignacy Potocki
  - Stanisław "Rewera" Potocki
  - Józef Potocki
  - Andrzej Potocki
  - Feliks Kazimierz Potocki
  - Katarzyna Potocka
  - Alfred Józef Potocki
  - Alfred Wojciech Potocki
  - Roman Potocki
  - Stanisław Kostka Potocki
  - Józef Potocki
  - Franciszek Salezy Potocki
  - Stanisław Szczęsny Potocki
  - Teodor Andrzej Potocki (Golden Piława)
  - Wiktoria Elżbieta Potocka
- House of Kamieniecki
  - Mikołaj Kamieniecki
  - Ludwik Kamieniecki
  - Marcin Kamieniecki
  - Jan Kazimierz Kamieniecki
  - Jan Kamieniecki
  - Henryk Andreas Kamieniecki
  - Piotr Kamieniecki
  - Henryk Kamieniecki
  - Dominik Kamieniecki
  - Andrzej Kamieniecki
- Klemens Moskarzewski
- Anna Stanisławska

== Family name changes during the Second World War and 1944–1953 ==
The communist government of Poland was in deep opposition to every rich (specially noble) family. Hundreds of Potockis were killed by NKVD and Red Army. Many Potockis, who decided to stay in Poland were forced to change their family names (otherwise they could be killed, imprisoned or have other problems).

The most popular changes was from Potocki to Nowak, Kowalski, Gnejowicz, Stanisławski, Pryszkiewicz, Wszelaki, Petecki, Blacha, Musiał, Woldan, Walera, Melka, Madej and Pastuch.

== Gallery ==
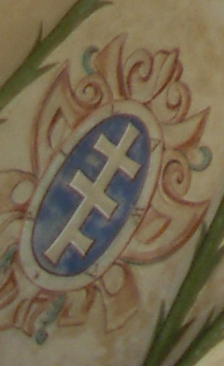
Piława coat of arms in Baranow-Sandomierski castle

Silver Piława

Golden Piława

Coat of arms of Counts Potocki

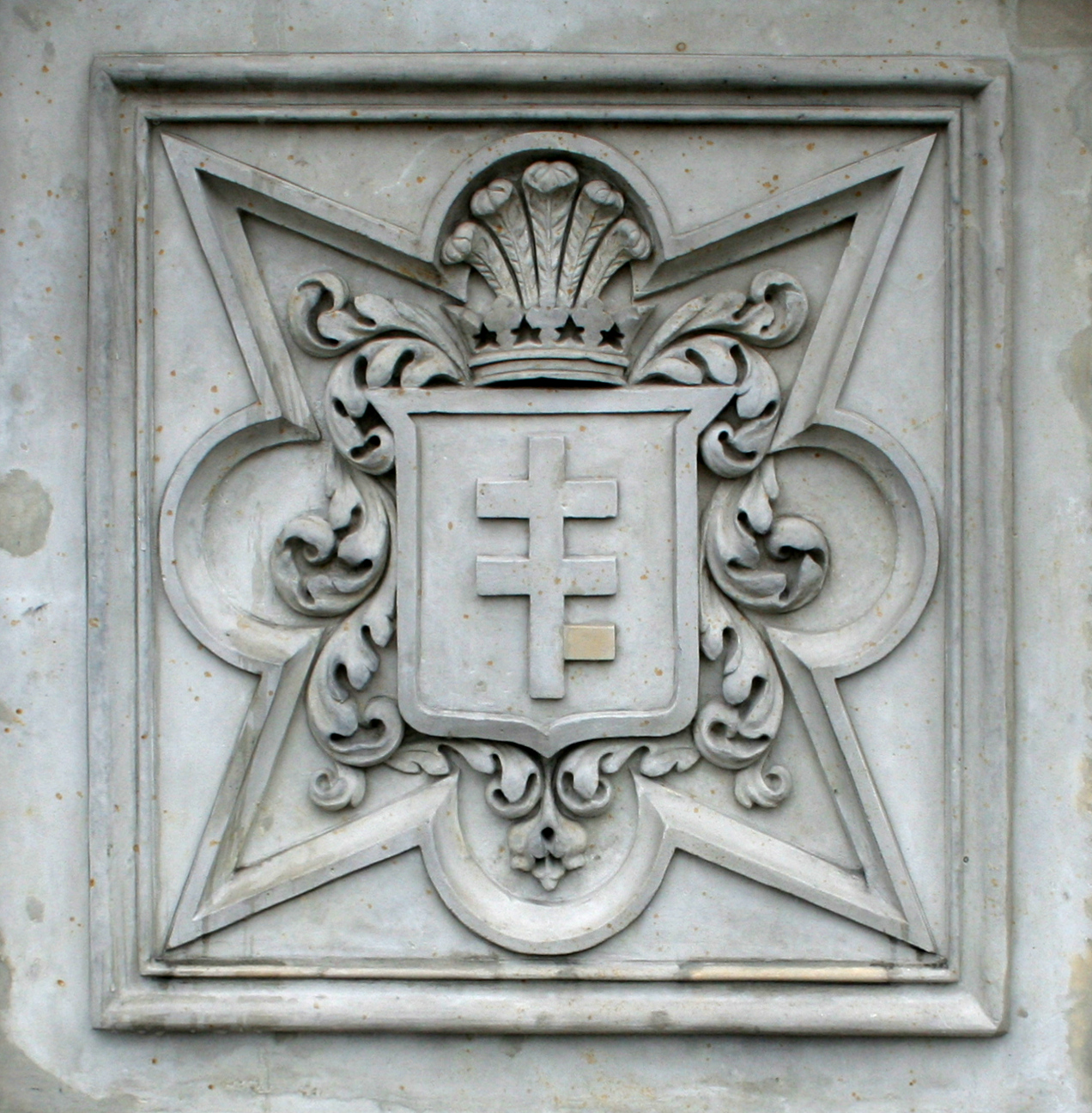
Piława at the Potocki mausoleum at Wilanow Park

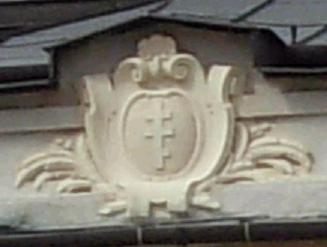
Piława at the Lańcut Castle

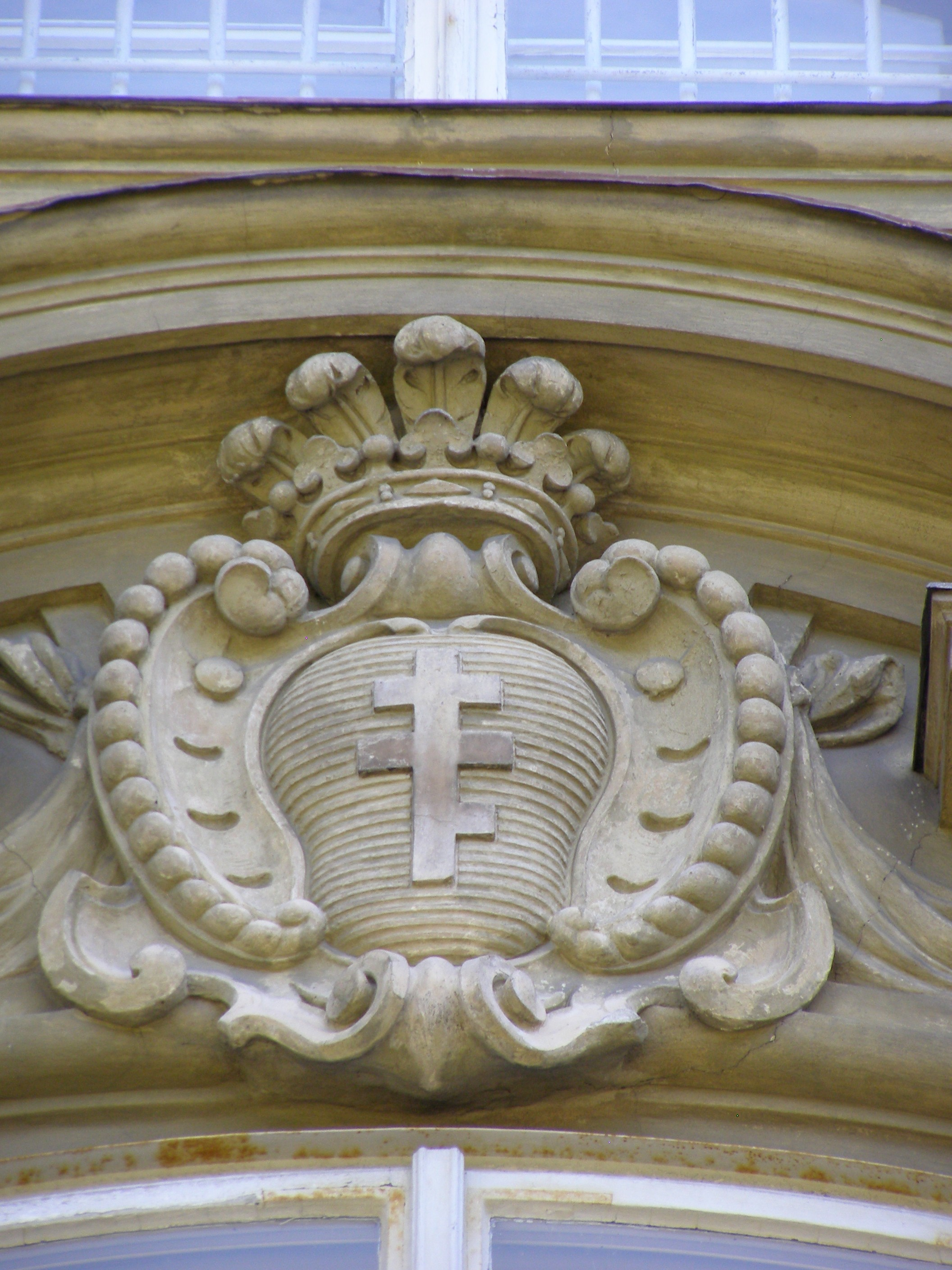
Piława at the Lańcut Castle

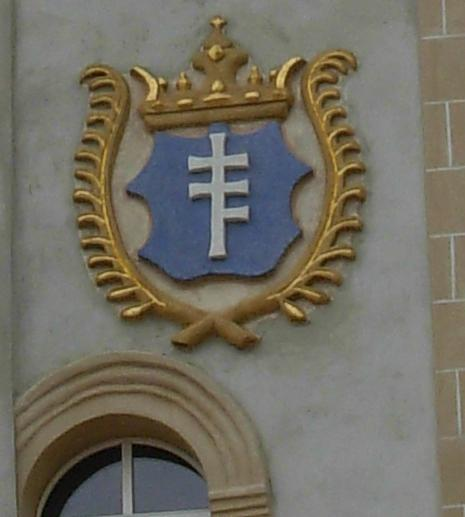
Piława at Leżajsk monastery

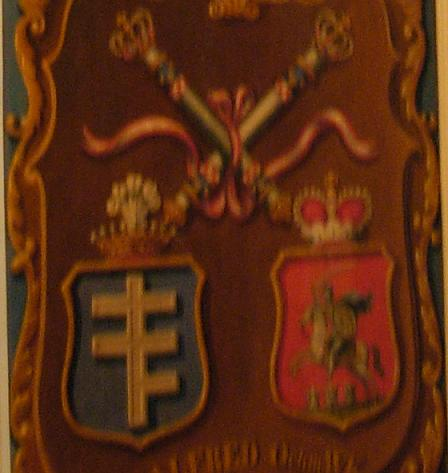
Piława and the Prices Czartoryski coat of arms in Lańcut Castle

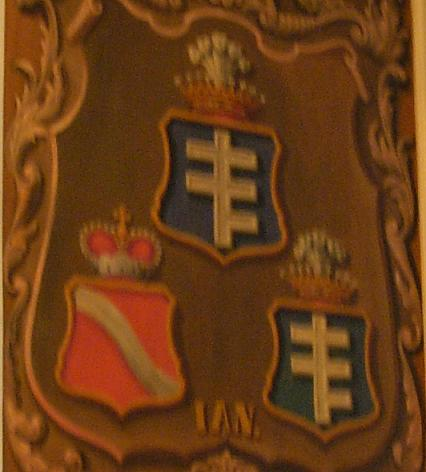
Piława and the Szreniawa coat of arms of the Prices Lubomirski in Lańcut Castle

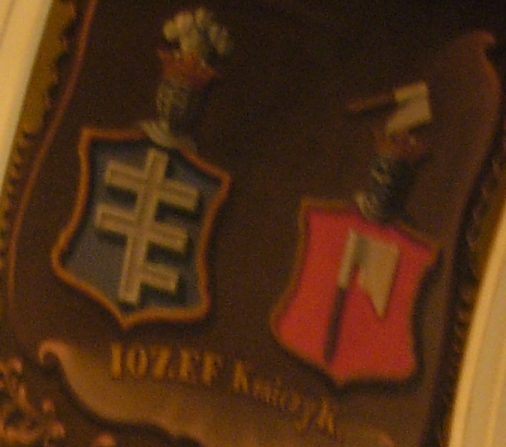
Piława and the Topór coat of arms in Lańcut Castle

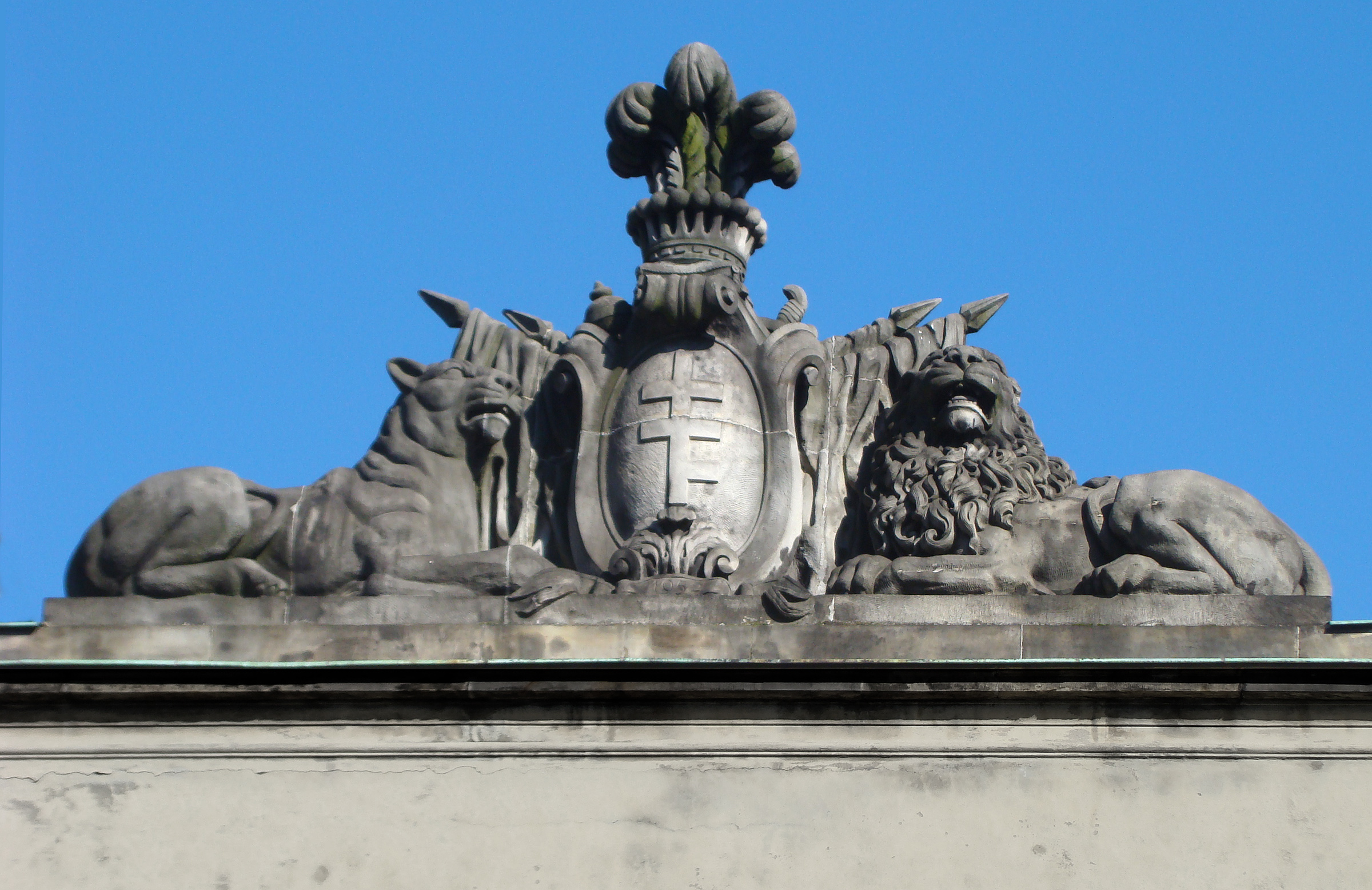
At Tyszkiewicz Palace in Warsaw

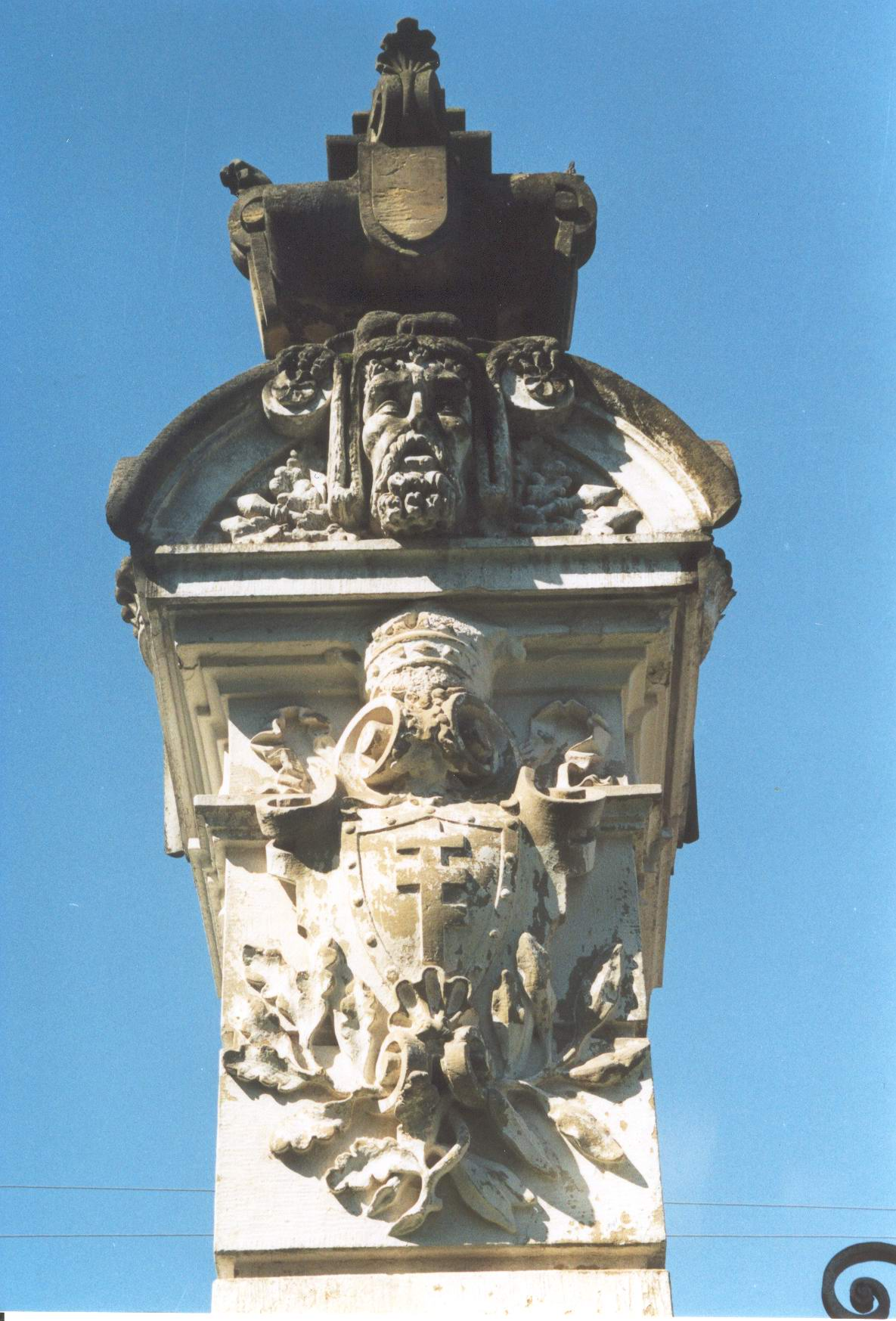
Piława at the Palace in Antoniny, Ukraine

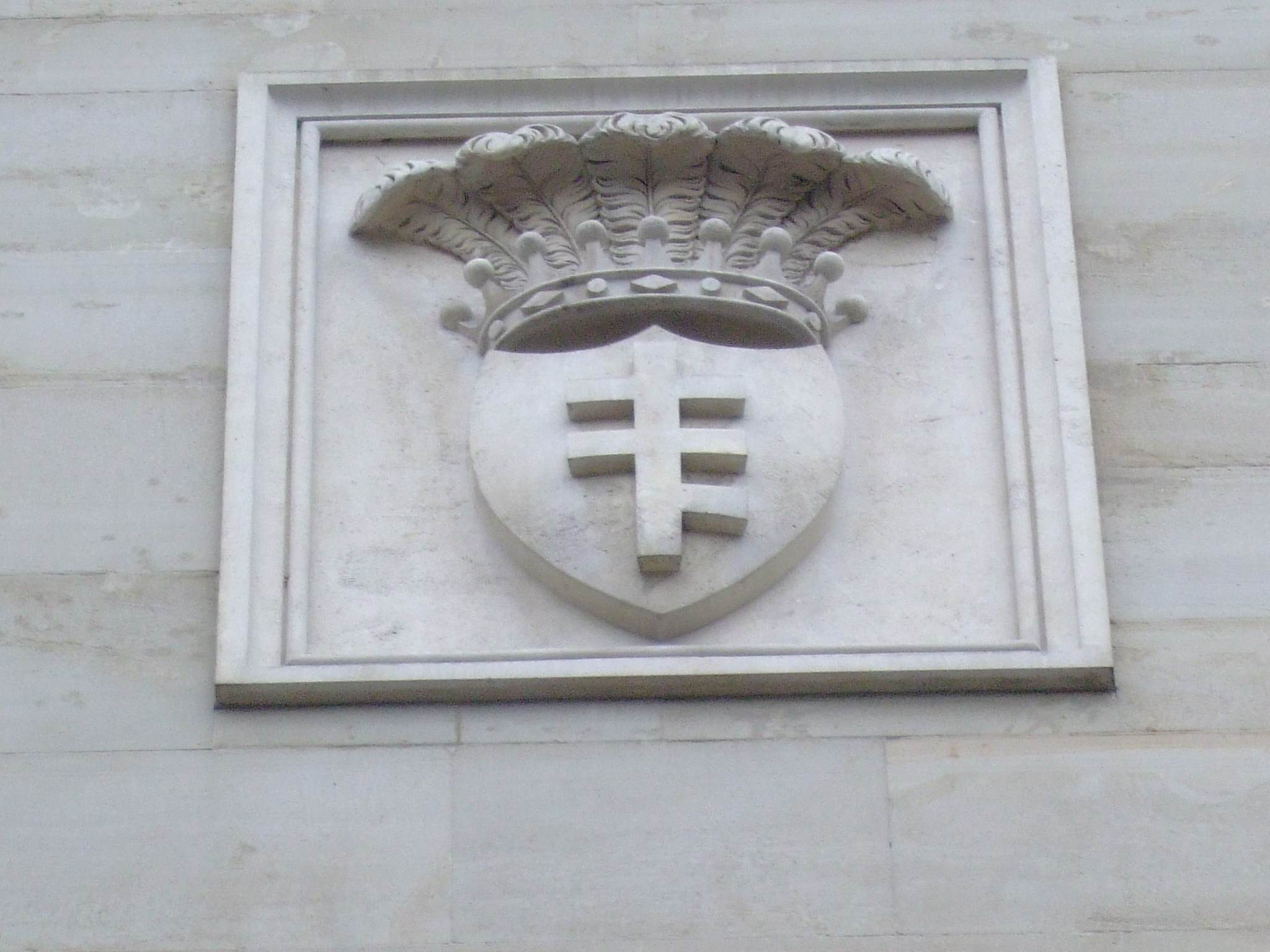
Piawa at St.Martin Church in w Krzeszowice

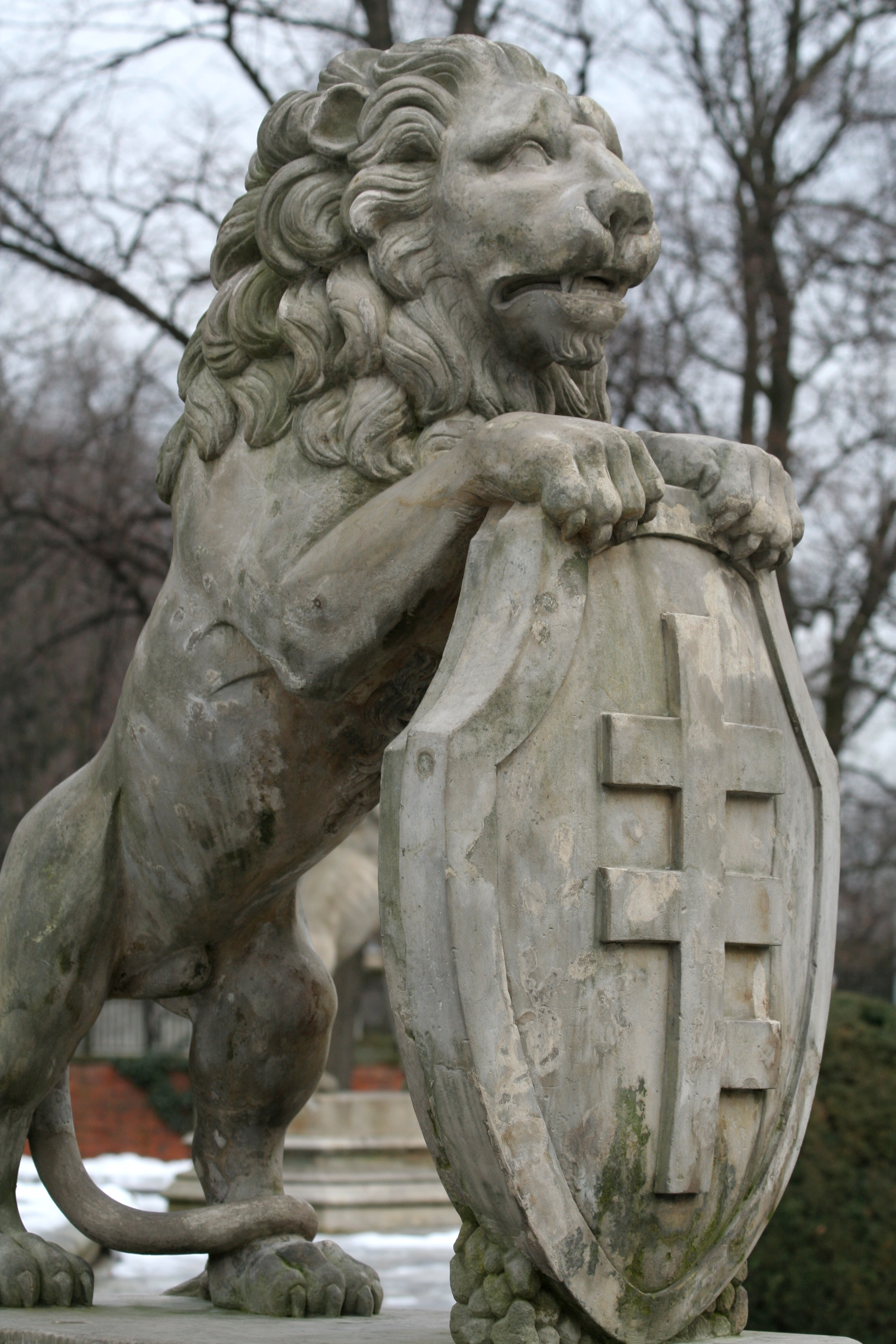
Wilanów Palace

Former coat of arms of Stanisławów (Iwano-Frankiwsk)

Paintings

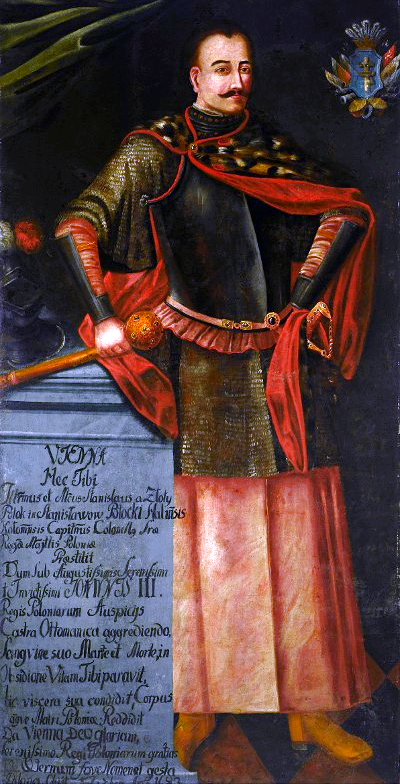
Piława on the painting of Stanisław Potocki

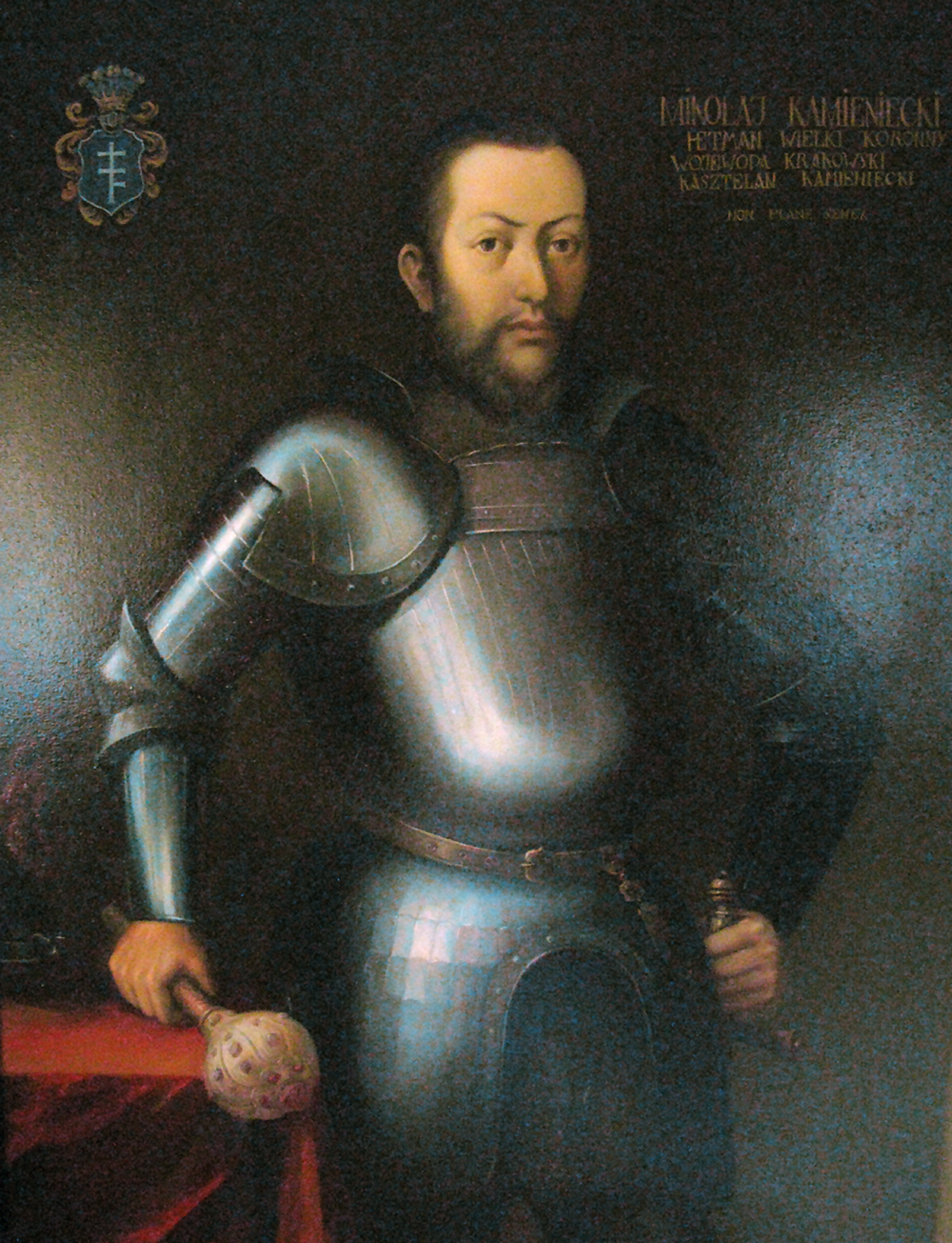
Piława on the painting of Mikołaj Kamieniecki

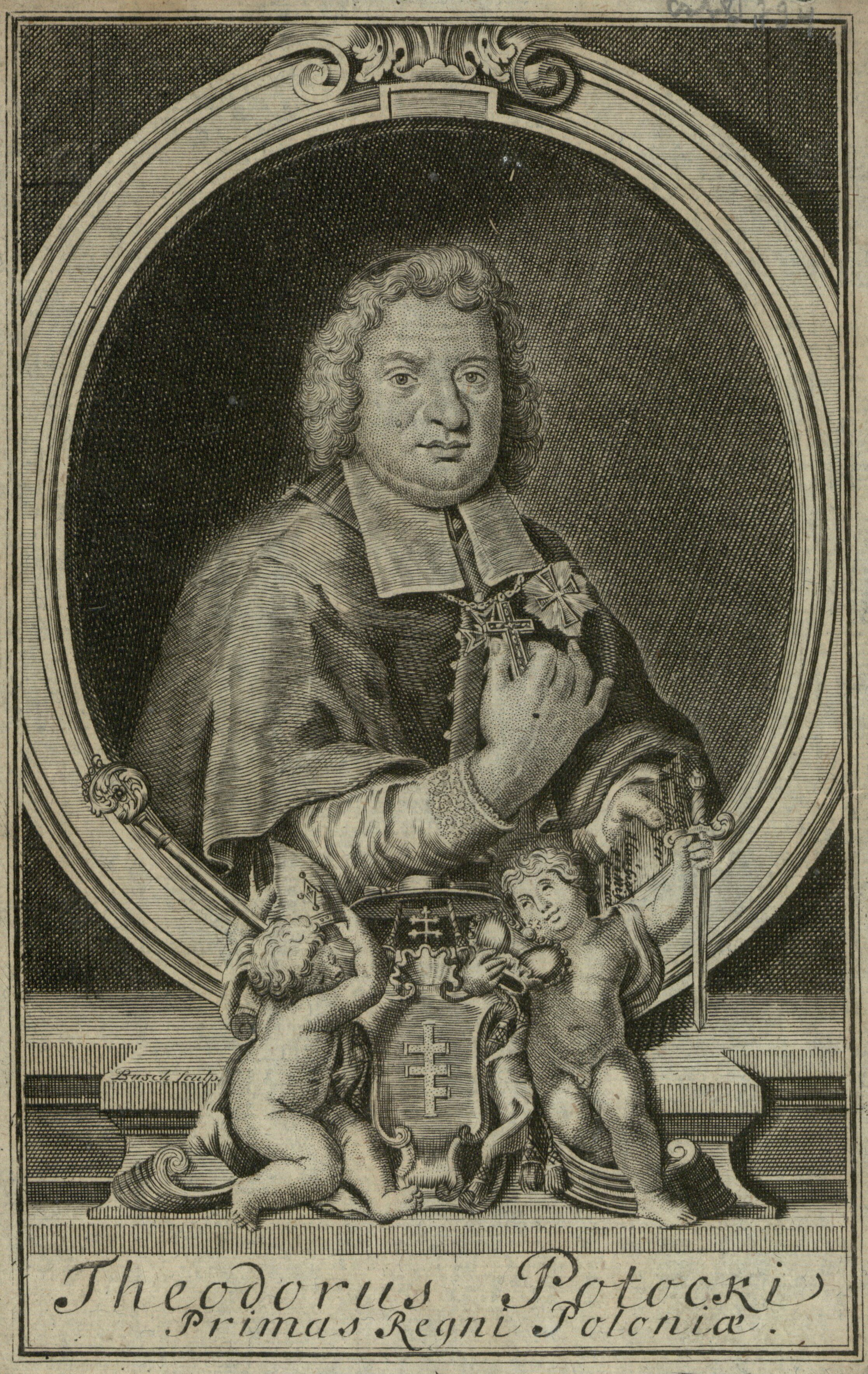
Piława on the painting of Teodor Andrzej Potocki

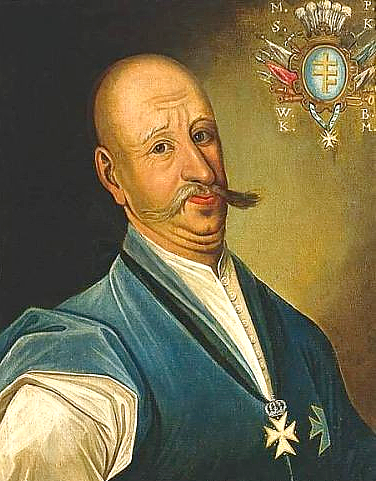
Golden Piława on the painting of Mikołaj Bazyli Potocki

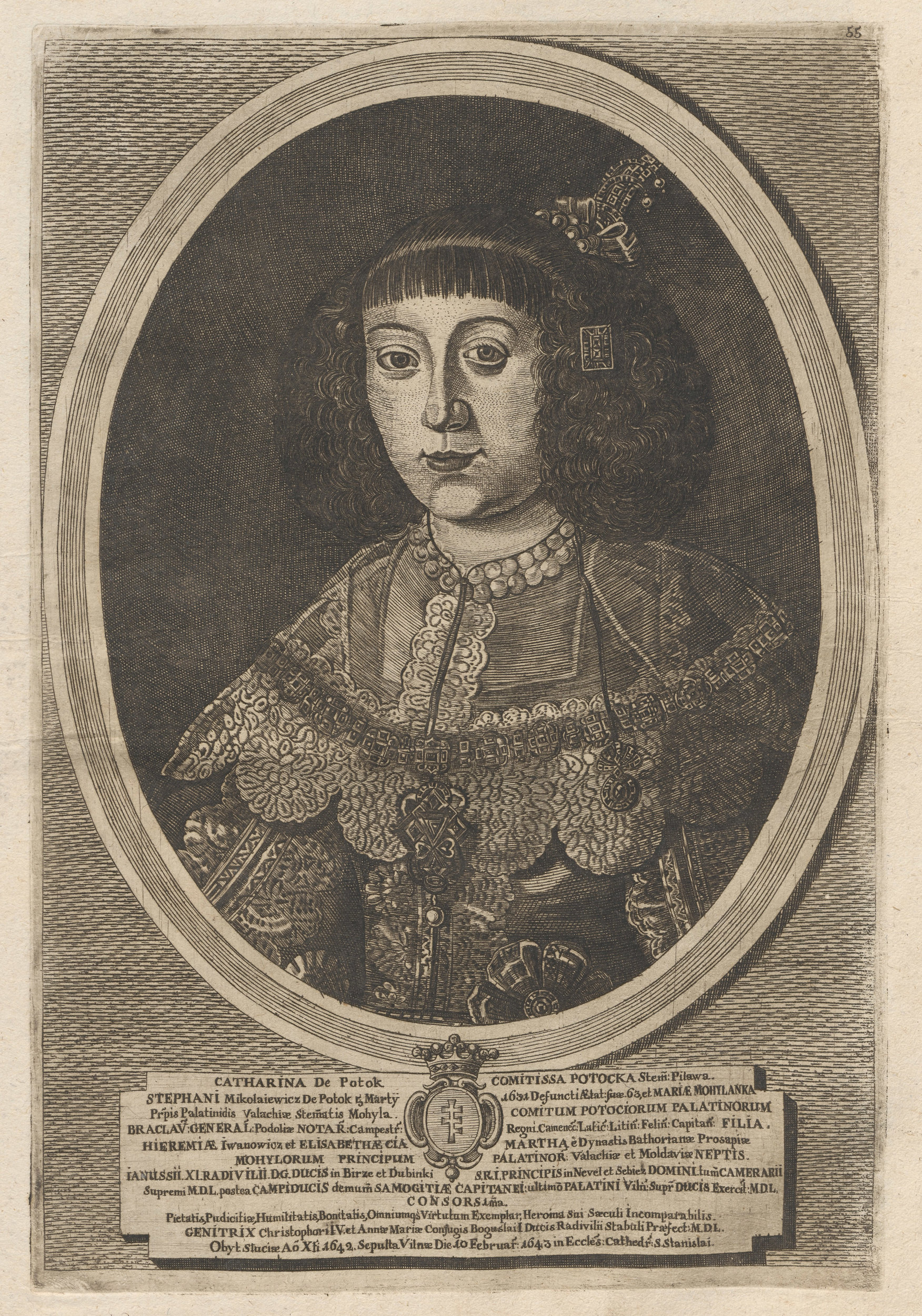
Piława on the painting of Katarzyna Potocka

== See also ==
- Polish heraldry
- Heraldic family
- List of Polish nobility coats of arms

== Bibliography ==
- Tadeusz Gajl: Herbarz polski od średniowiecza do XX wieku : ponad 4500 herbów szlacheckich 37 tysięcy nazwisk 55 tysięcy rodów. L&L, 2007. ISBN 978-83-60597-10-1.
