= Wiktoria Leszczyńska =

Polish stage actress (fl. 1768)

Wiktoria Leszczyńska née Milewska (fl. 1768) was a Polish stage actress. She is known as one of the first two native pioneer actresses in Poland.

== Life and career ==
Wiktoria Leszczyńska was the daughter of Józef Milewski.

She was employed as a member of the pioneer group of actors engaged upon the foundation of the National Theatre, Warsaw. Prior to this, only foreign (normally French and Italian) theater companies had been active in Poland. The foundation of the national theater therefore signified the starting point of the first professional Polish theater, and the actors educated and employed at the newly founded theater was thus the first native professional actors in Poland. With no training, they were tutored by the theater direction, the playwrights and enthusiastic noble amateurs.

She participated in the inauguration performance of the National Theatre, Natrętów, on 19 November 1765, likely in the role of Utciszewska. Thus, she and her female colleague, Antonina Prusinowska, became historic as the first native actresses in Poland. A critic mentioned, that the two actresses were both noblewomen who had abandoned their husbands; and that they both acted well, if somewhat hesitant. They were both active at the theater for two years.

She retired in 1767 and was given financial compensation for breach of contract in 1768.
