= Battle of Vienna =

1683 battle between the Christian European States and the Ottomans

Siege and Battle of Vienna
- Part of the Great Turkish War, the Ottoman–Habsburg wars, and the Polish–Ottoman War
- Battle of Vienna, 12 September 1683
Date	Siege: 14 July – 11 September 1683 (1 month, 4 weeks and 1 day); Battle: 12 September 1683
Location	Vienna, Archduchy of Austria, Holy Roman Empire (now Vienna, Austria) 48°14′06″N 16°20′06″E
Result	Christian coalition victory

Belligerents
Ottoman Empire; Crimean Khanate; Upper Hungary; Moldavia; Transylvania; Wallachia	Holy Roman Empire; Habsburg monarchy; Archduchy of Austria; Poland–Lithuania; Crown of the Kingdom of Poland

Commanders and leaders
Kara Mustafa Pasha; Kara Mehmed Pasha; Sarı Hüseyin Pasha; Murad Giray (Moldavia) George Ducas (Wallachia) Șerban Cantacuzino	(Polish–Lithuanian Commonwealth) John III Sobieski (Polish–Lithuanian Commonwealth) Stanisław Jan Jabłonowski (Polish–Lithuanian Commonwealth) Mikołaj Hieronim Sieniawski (Holy Roman Empire) Charles of Lorraine (Holy Roman Empire) Julius Francis of Saxe-Lauenburg (Holy Roman Empire) (Electorate of Saxony) John George III of Saxony (Holy Roman Empire) (Electorate of Bavaria) Georg Friedrich of Waldeck (Holy Roman Empire) Count Starhemberg (Viennese garrison)

Units involved
	see Order of battle

Strength
90,000 men arrived for the campaign (Note: 35,000 men were left detached at Győr and 50,000 men were left during the battle.); 28,400–50,000 men during the siege with around 60 guns (Note: Ágoston Gábor claims that contemporary Ottoman chronicles claim there was 28,400 Turkish soldiers during the battle. However, Şakul Kahraman directly adresses this 28,400 claim and says that this was the total number of the Ottoman left wing and parts of the center.); 10,000–15,000 men were stationed at the defenses around Vienna to stop the garrison from counterattacking, leaving around 13,000–35,000 men to fight the relief army. (Note: According to Austrian historian Otto Forst de Battaglia, 150,000 men were present at Vienna as of 10 September 1683,. Polish Historian Jan Wimmer claimed this was a number that decreased from 170,000 at the start of the campaign, of which he claimed was the order of battle allegedly found in Kara Mustafa's tent. However, it has been argued these numbers are inflated and do not show a precise count of Turkish soldiers at Vienna. In fact, western sources, according to Kahraman, suggest that Ottoman commanders inflated the figures with the intention of goading Kara Mustafa Pasha, whom they detested, into entering a battle in which he would ultimately be defeated, thus rendering the alleged order of battle false. Older estimates give numbers up to 300,000) ^{– alternative estimates}	Viennese garrison: 24,700 at the start of the siege; 16,000 soldiers (10,000 infantry + 6,000 cuirassiers); 8,700 militia; 312 guns but only 141 operational; 16,000 men during the battle (Note: 11,000 soldiers, 5000 volunteers) Relief force: 70,000–80,000 soldiers with 140–200 guns: According to Şakul: 18,500 Austrians; 28,500 Germans; 18,000 Poles; 5,000 Hungarians; According to Podhorodecki: 27,000 Polish army; 18,000 Imperial forces; 9,000 Saxon corps; 10,500 Bavarian corps; 9,500 Swabian corps; According to Agoston: 35,000–40,000 Germans; 20,000 Imperial forces; 20,000 Poles; Total: 90,000–104,700 but some left behind to guard bridges near Tulln and camps, plus 2,000 Imperial cavalry (not included above) left behind the Danube. (Note: Viennese garrison: 15,000 soldiers + 8,700 volunteers, 370 cannons Relief force: 50,000–60,000 Germans, 15,000–20,000 Poles,) ^{– alternative estimates}

Casualties and losses
Total casualties: 32,544 combatants (Note: Including siege and battle losses) (Note: The total number of Ottoman casualties is 48,544, 16,000 of which were beldars, who were non combatants mostly responsible for constructing roads, bridges, carrying cannons, opening water wells, etc.): 2,000 Tatars; 6,000 miners; 10,000 janissaries; 12,000 sipahis; 16,000 beldars (non-combatants); Casualties during the battle: 8,000–20,000	Total casualties: 16,500–20,000 combatants Casualties during the siege: 12,000 Casualties during the battle: 4,500; 3,500 dead or wounded (1,300 Poles)
- Heavy civilian casualties, with at least 57,220 civilians enslaved by the Ottomans

The Battle of Vienna (Note: German: Schlacht am Kahlenberg, lit. 'Battle of the Bald Mountain'; Polish: Odsiecz Wiedeńska, lit. 'Relief of Vienna' or Bitwa Pod Wiedniem; Ottoman Turkish: بچ محاصرهسى, romanized: Beç Muḥāṣarası, lit. 'Siege of Beç'; Turkish: İkinci Viyana Kuşatması, lit. 'Second Siege of Vienna' or Almandağı Meydan Muharebesi 'Battle of The German Mountain') took place at Kahlenberg Mountain near Vienna on 12 September 1683 after the city had been besieged by the Ottoman Empire for two months. The battle was fought between an Ottoman army commanded by Grand Vizier Kara Mustafa Pasha and a coalition of Imperial German and Polish Crown forces under the overall command of King John III Sobieski of the Polish–Lithuanian Commonwealth. The main Lithuanian army did not arrive in time to participate in the battle.

The battle was won by the combined forces of the Holy Roman Empire and the Polish–Lithuanian Commonwealth, marking the beginning of their military cooperation against the Ottomans.

Some historians maintain that the battle marked a turning point in the Ottoman–Habsburg wars, a 300-year struggle between the Holy Roman and Ottoman Empires. It represented the culmination of 150 years of intense military tension following the failed 1529 siege of Vienna. In the ensuing war that lasted until 1699, the Holy Roman Empire consolidated territorial gains resulting in most of Ottoman Hungary being ceded to Leopold I, Holy Roman Emperor.

The Viennese garrison was led by Ernst Rüdiger von Starhemberg, General of the Artillery of the Holy Roman Imperial Army and a subject of Emperor Leopold I. The overall command was held by the senior allied leader, the King of Poland, John III Sobieski, who led the relief forces. The Lithuanian army was delayed, and only reached Vienna after it had been relieved. The forces of the Ottoman Empire and its vassal states were commanded by Grand Vizier Merzifonlu Kara Mustafa Pasha.

The Ottoman army numbered 28,400 men or approximately 50,000 men during the siege. The total number of the campaign force numbered around 90,000, however, 35,000 men were left detached at Győr and 50,000 men were left at Vienna. The Ottomans began the siege on 14 July 1683. The battle is noted for including the largest known cavalry charge in history.

== Prelude ==
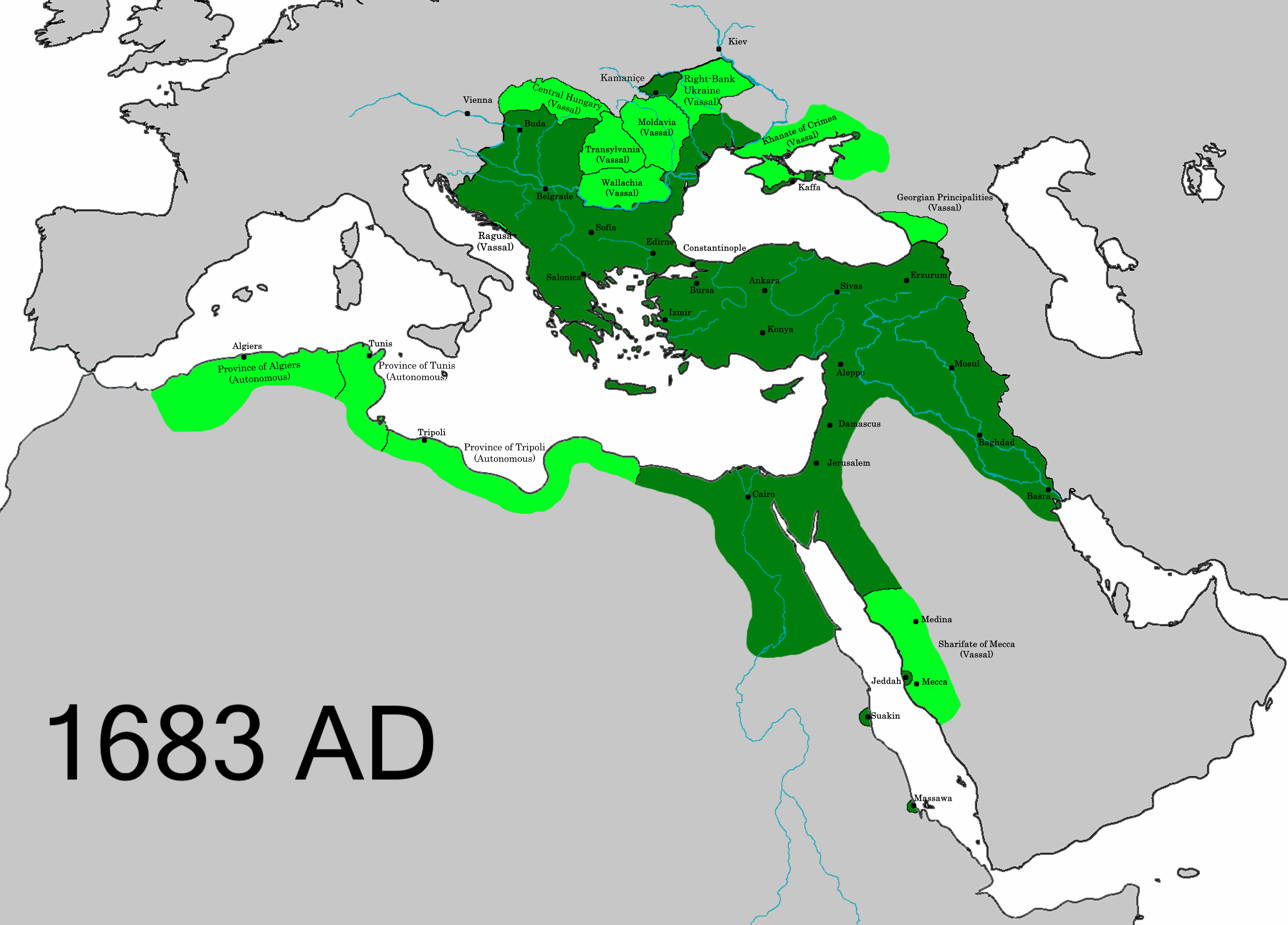
The Ottoman Empire in 1683

Capturing the city of Vienna had long been a strategic aspiration of the Ottoman Empire, due to the control the city had over the Danube and the overland trade routes to Germany and the Eastern Mediterranean. During the years preceding the siege, the Ottoman Empire, under the auspices of the Grand Vizier Kara Mustafa Pasha, undertook extensive logistical preparations, including the repair and establishment of roads and bridges leading into the Holy Roman Empire and its logistical centers, as well as the forwarding of ammunition, cannons, and other resources from all over the Empire to these centers and into the Balkans. The Siege of Szigetvár in 1566 blocked the advance of Sultan Suleiman the Magnificent towards Vienna and stopped the Ottoman advance towards Vienna that year. Vienna was not threatened again until 1683. In 1679 plague had been raging in Vienna.

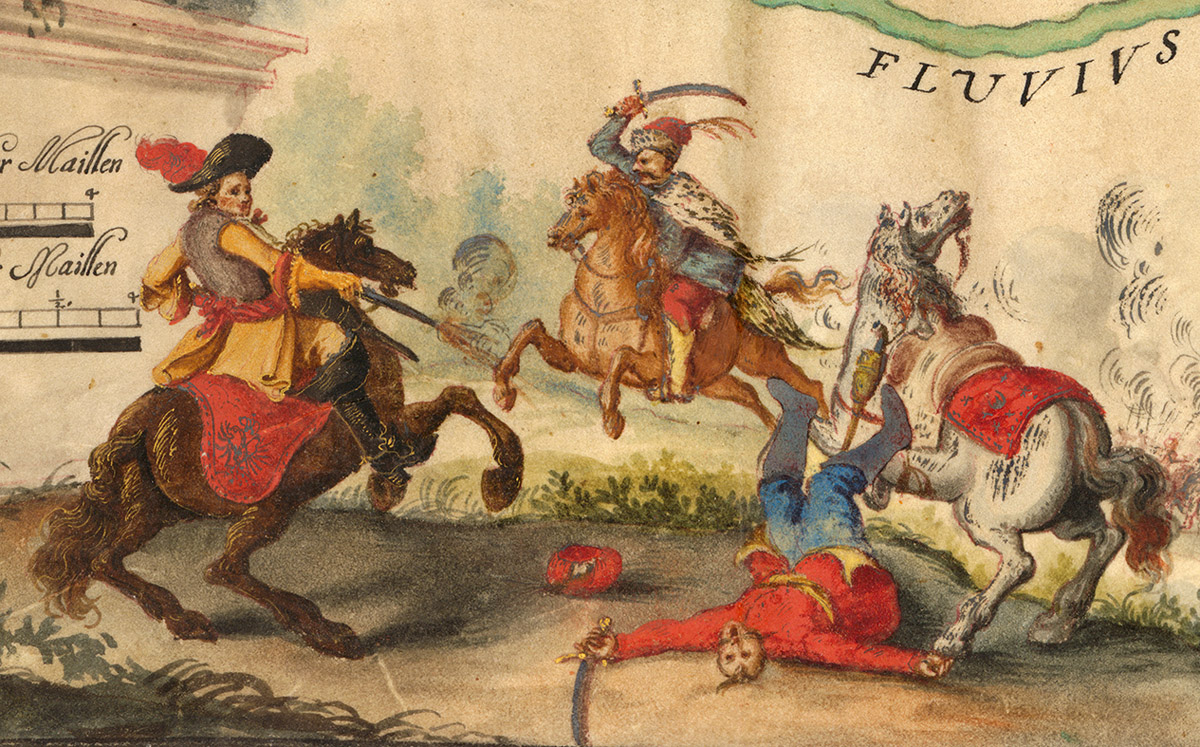
Skirmish between Hungarian anti-Habsburg Kuruc rebels and Habsburg loyalists

On the political front, the Ottoman Empire had been providing military assistance to the Hungarians and non-Catholic minorities in Habsburg-occupied portions of Hungary. There, in the years preceding the siege, widespread unrest had grown into open rebellion against Leopold I's pursuit of Counter-Reformation principles and his desire to suppress Protestantism. In 1681, Protestants and other anti-Habsburg Kuruc forces, led by Imre Thököly, were reinforced with a significant military contingent from the Ottomans, who recognized Thököly as King of "Upper Hungary" (the eastern part of modern-day Slovakia and parts of northeastern Hungary, which he had earlier taken by force from the Habsburgs). This support included explicitly promising the "Kingdom of Vienna" to the Hungarians if it fell into Ottoman hands. Yet before the siege, a state of peace had existed for 20 years between the Holy Roman Empire and the Ottoman Empire as a result of the Peace of Vasvár.

In 1681 and 1682, clashes between the forces of Imre Thököly and the Holy Roman Empire (the border of which was then northern Hungary) intensified, and the incursions of Habsburg forces into central Hungary provided the crucial argument of Grand Vizier Kara Mustafa Pasha in convincing Sultan Mehmed IV and his Divan to allow the movement of the Ottoman army. Mehmed IV authorized Mustafa Pasha to operate as far as Győr (then known as Yanıkkale, and in German as Raab) and Komárom (in Turkish Komaron, Komorn in German) Castles, both in northwestern Hungary, and to besiege them. The Ottoman army was mobilized on 21 January 1682 and war was declared on 6 August 1682.

Logistically, it would have been risky or impossible to launch an invasion in August or September 1682, since a three-month campaign would have taken the Ottomans to Vienna just as winter set in. But the 15-month gap between mobilization and the launch of a full-scale invasion provided ample time for Vienna to prepare its defense and for Leopold to assemble troops from the Holy Roman Empire and form an alliance with Poland, Venice and Pope Innocent XI. The defensive alliance of the Holy Roman Empire with Poland was concluded in the 1683 Treaty of Warsaw, by which Leopold promised to support John III Sobieski if the Ottomans attacked Kraków, and in return, the Polish army would come to the relief of Vienna if it were attacked.

On 31 March, another declaration – sent by Grand Vizier Merzifonlu Kara Mustafa Pasha on behalf of Mehmed IV – arrived at the Imperial Court in Vienna. The next day the forward march of Ottoman army elements began from Edirne in Rumelia. Ottoman troops reached Belgrade by early May. They were joined by a Transylvanian army under Prince Mihaly Apafi and a Hungarian force under Imre Thököly; they laid siege to Győr, leaving 35,000 troops there, and the remaining army of 50,000 moved toward the city of Vienna. Spencer Tucker alleged that 40,000 Crimean Tatar troops arrived 40 kilometres (25 mi) east of Vienna on 7 July, which he claimed was twice as many as the Imperial troops in the area. However, the total population of the Crimean Khanate in the mid 17th century, which was around 180,000, couldn't physically sustain such a massive army. Even a nation with 20% of their total male population as soldiers could only make up about 18,000 men. Add onto this that some of these forces have to be left back home in order to defend their own nation against Cossack raids and raid Europe themselves. Not even this total force of a few thousand men could all join this one battle waged by their liege that is happening thousands of kilometers away. Emperor Leopold fled Vienna for Passau with his court and 60,000 Viennese, while Charles V, Duke of Lorraine, withdrew his force of 20,000 towards Linz. The main Ottoman army arrived at Vienna on 14 July; the city's only defense force was now Count Starhemberg's 15,000 men. Saxon engineer Georg Rimpler, who had been employed by the empire to prepare for war with the Turks, began to prepare Vienna for the upcoming siege – much of Austria's pre-war plans had calculated on fighting the Turks near the city of Győr, a plan made untenable by the Turkish advance.

The King of Poland, John III Sobieski, prepared a relief expedition to Vienna during the summer of 1683, honoring his obligations to the treaty, and departed from Kraków on 15 August. Sobieski had employed Greeks, who were considered natural allies, as intelligence agents, who provided him with information on the movements of Ottoman troops. During this time, most of Poland was largely undefended, and taking advantage of the situation, Imre Thököly attempted an invasion. Kazimierz Jan Sapieha delayed the march of the Lithuanian army, campaigning in the Hungarian Highlands instead, and arrived in Vienna only after it had been relieved. The king also did not wait for the 1,200 Cossacks whose recruitment had begun as early as May 1683. Only a unit of about 150 men marched with him to Vienna, while the rest of the Cossacks joined the Polish forces after the battle.

Immediately, tensions rose between Poland and the various German states – especially Austria – over the relief of the city. Payment of troops' wages and supplies while marching would be the predominant issue. Sobieski insisted that he should not have to pay for his march to Vienna, since it was by his efforts that the city had been saved; nor could the Viennese neglect the other German troops who had marched. The Habsburg leadership found as much money as possible to pay for these and arranged deals with the Polish to limit their costs.

== Events during the siege ==
The main Ottoman army laid siege to Vienna on 14 July. On the same day, Kara Mustafa sent the traditional demand that the city surrender to the Ottoman Empire. (Note: The original document was destroyed during World War II. For the German translation, see here Archived 29 May 2008 at the Wayback Machine) Starhemberg, leader of the remaining 15,000 troops and 8,700 volunteers with 370 cannons, refused to capitulate. Only days before, he had received news of the mass slaughter at Perchtoldsdorf, a town south of Vienna, where the citizens had handed over the keys of the city after having been given a similar choice but were killed anyway. Siege operations started on 17 July.

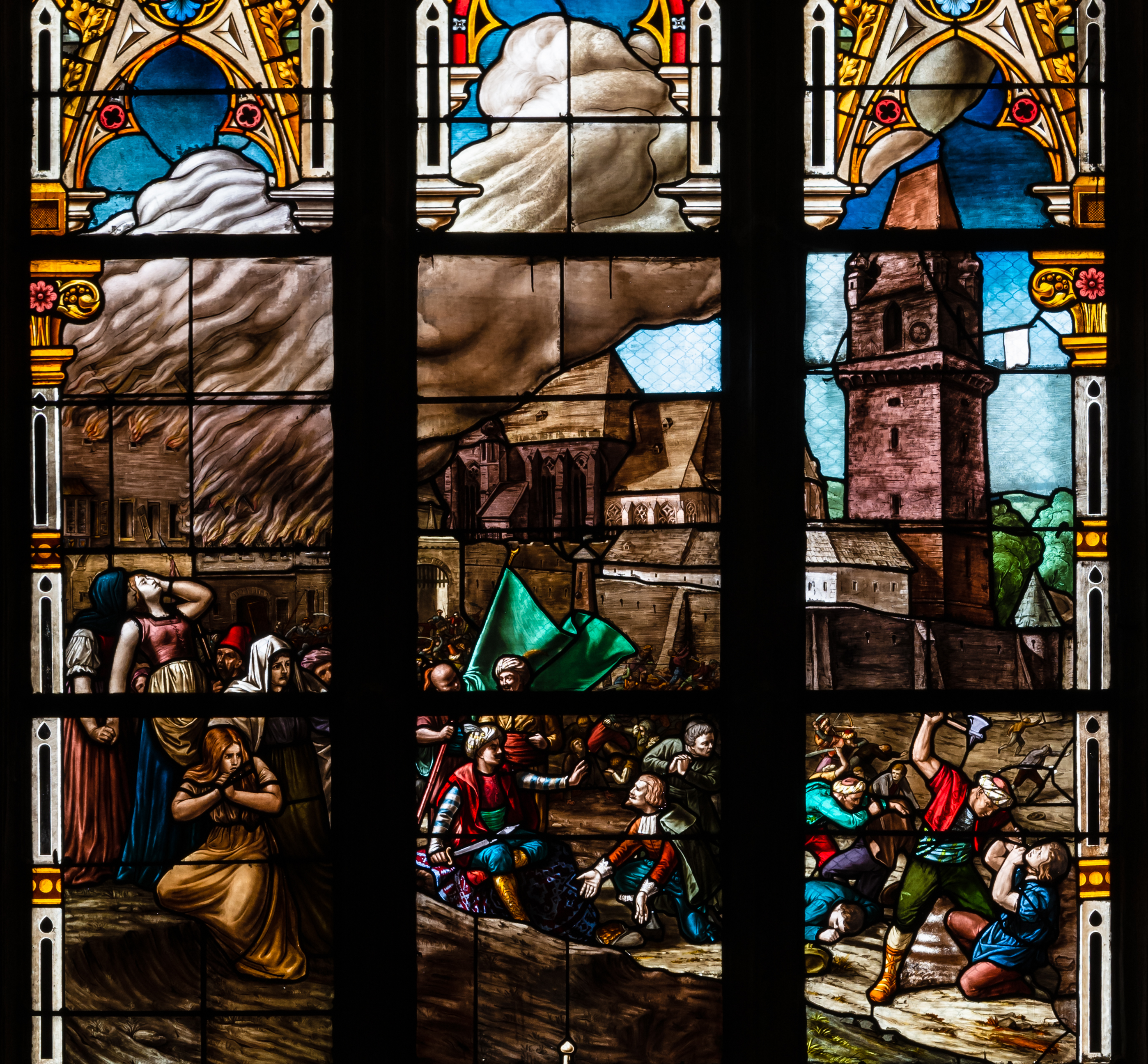
The plundering of Perchtoldsdorf, parish church Perchtoldsdorf

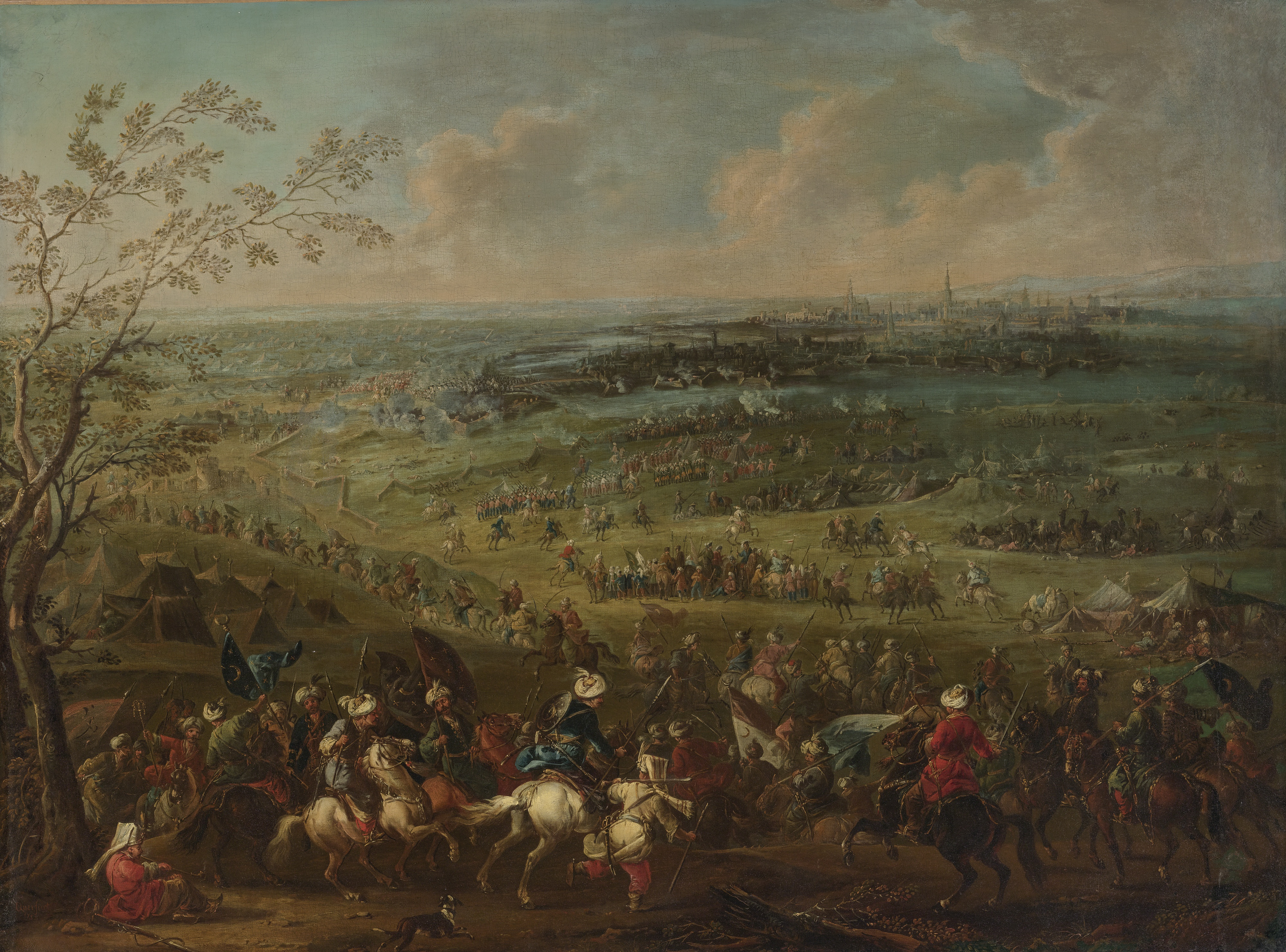
The Ottomans before the walls of Vienna, by August Querfurt

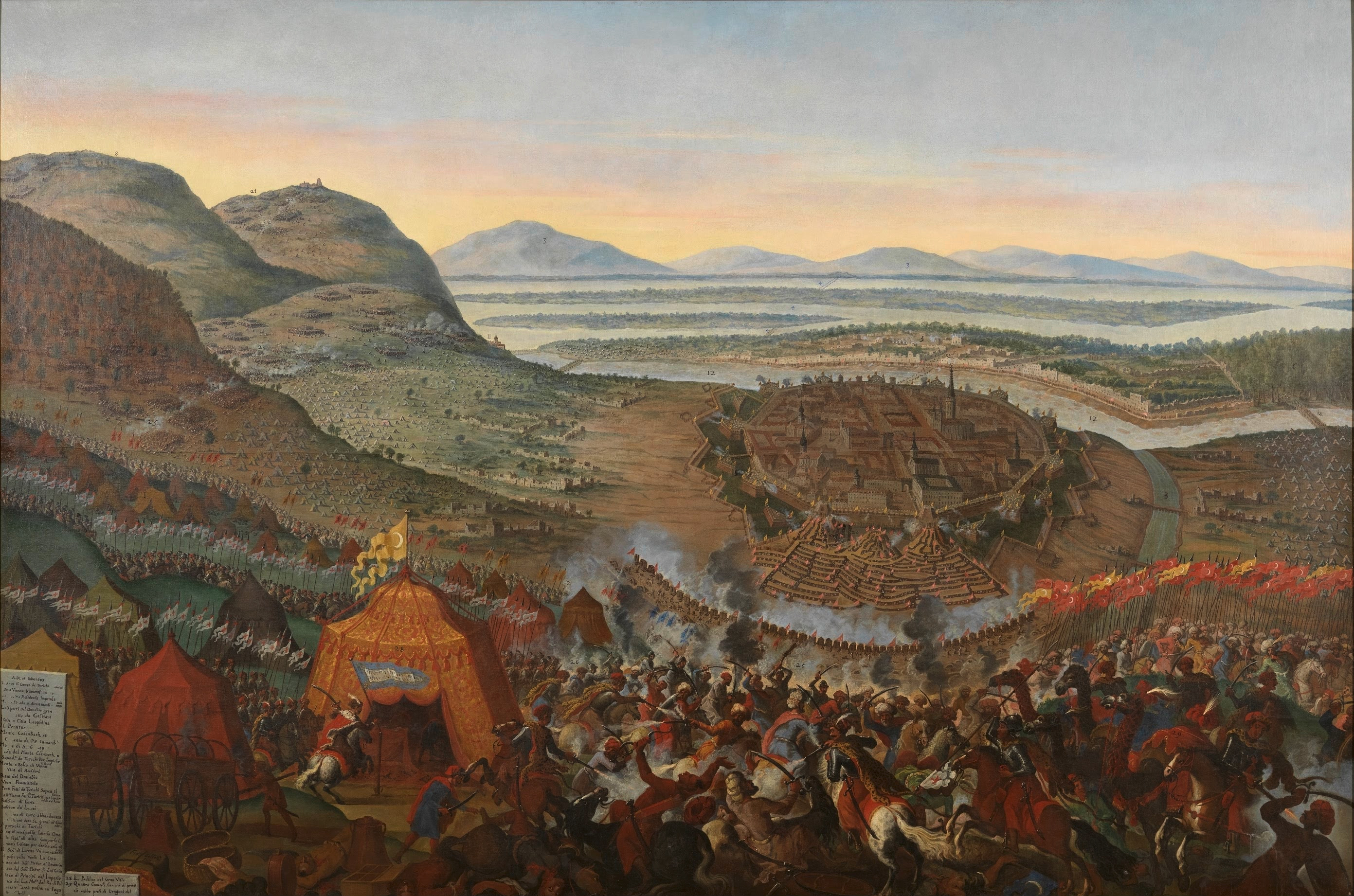
The Ottoman Army surrounds Vienna, by Frans Geffels

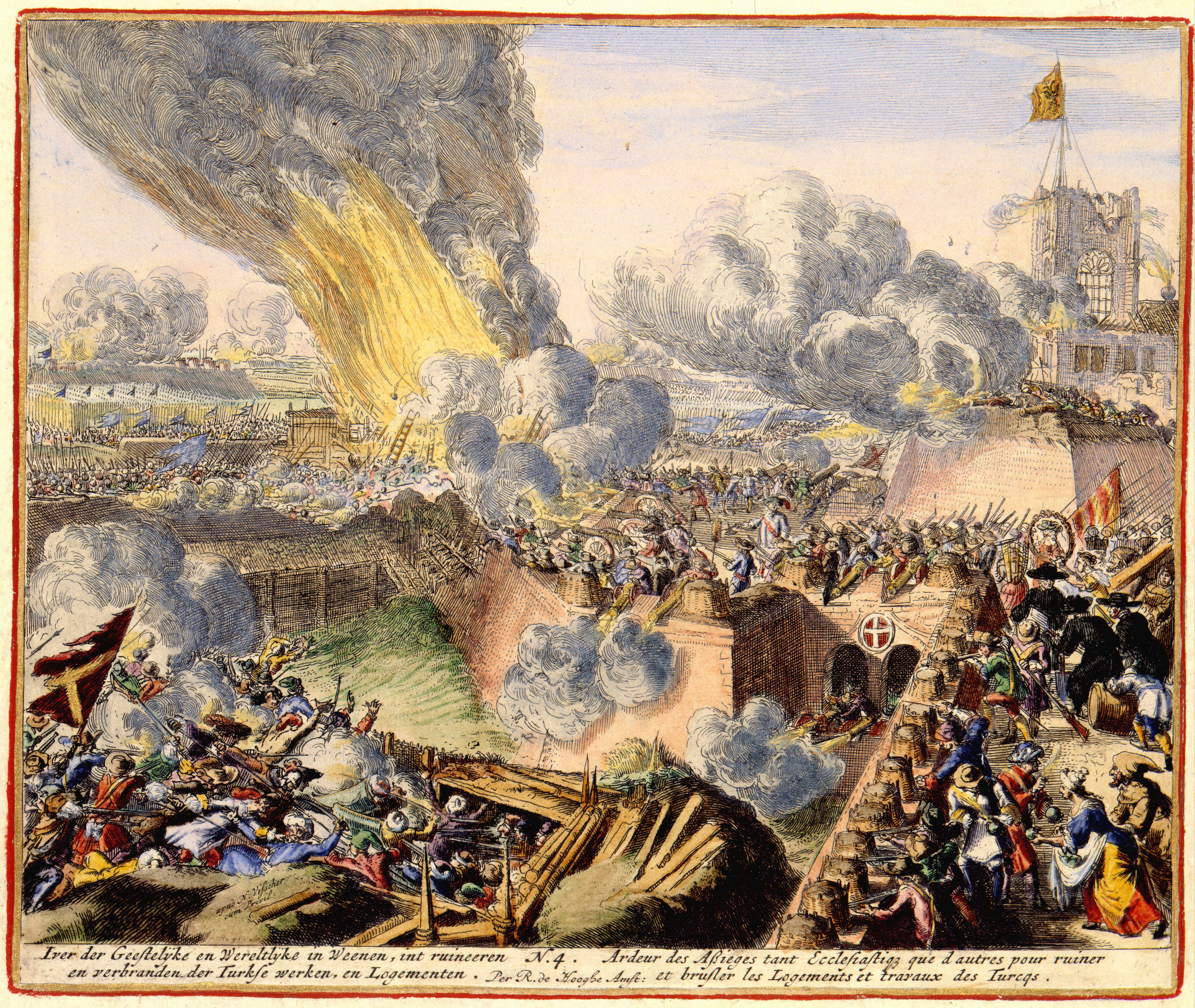
Civilian defence of Viennas fortifications, by Romeyn de Hooghe

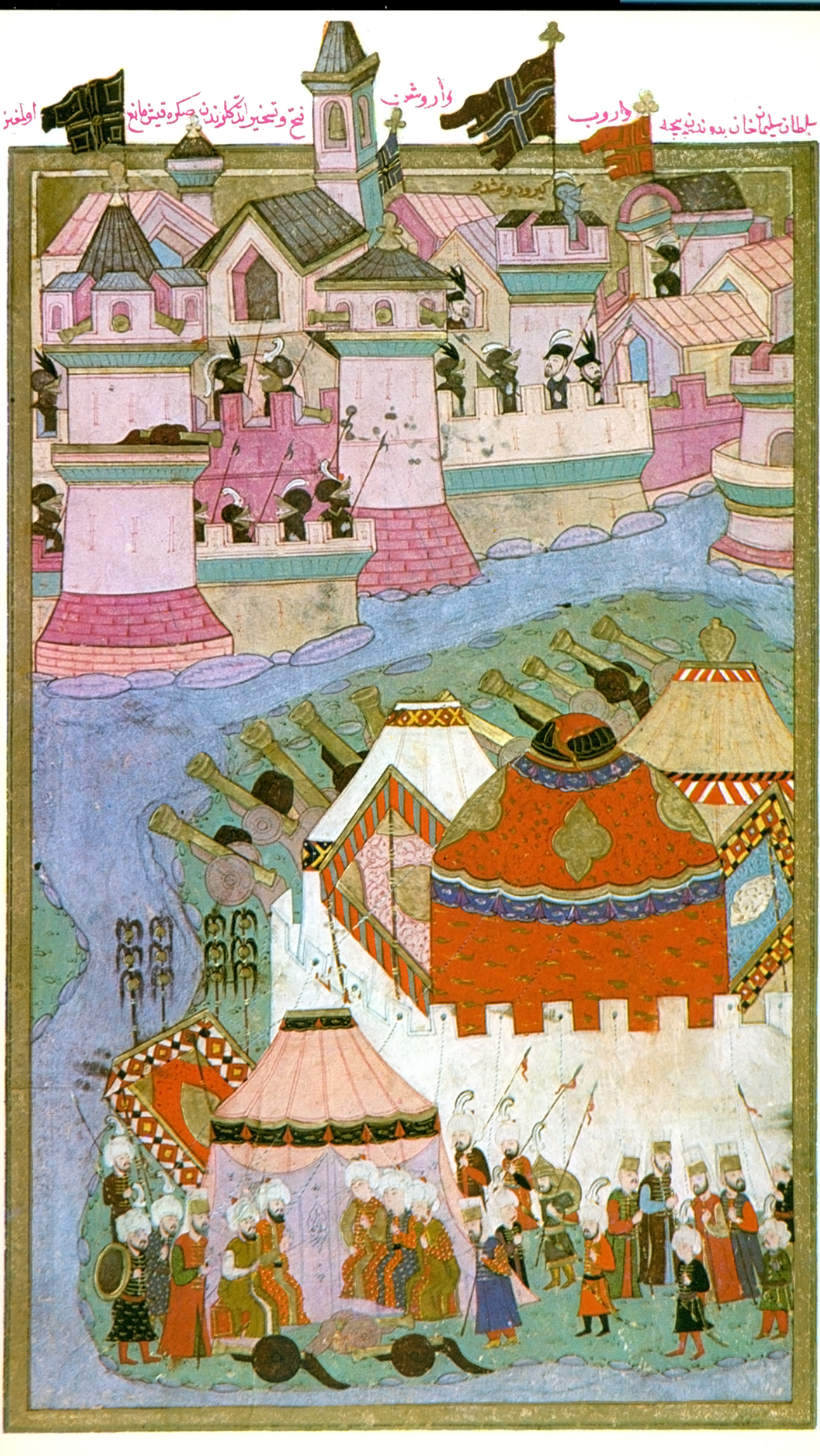
War council after the unsuccessful siege of Vienna in 1529

The Viennese had demolished many of the houses around the city walls and cleared the debris, leaving an empty plain that would expose the Ottomans to defensive fire if they tried to rush into the city. In response to this Kara Mustafa Pasha would order his forces to dig long lines of trenches directly toward the city, to help protect them from the defenders as they advanced.

The Ottomans had 130 field guns and 19 medium-caliber cannon, compared to the defenders' 370. They built a large battery of guns instead of relying on the usual circum- and contravallation. From July 14 to July 15, the battery grew to a width of 230 m. Mining tunnels were dug under the city walls, which would then be filled with sufficient quantities of black powder to demolish the walls. According to Andrew Wheatcroft, the outer palisade was around 150 years old and mostly rotten. To counter this, the defenders set to work knocking very large tree trunks into the ground to surround the walls. This disrupted the Ottoman plan of a quick siege, adding almost another three weeks to the time it would take to get past the old palisade. This, combined with the delay in advancing their army after declaring war, eventually allowed a relief force to arrive in September. Some historians have speculated that Kara Mustafa wanted to take the city intact with its riches and declined an all-out attack, not wishing to initiate the plundering that would accompany an assault, which was viewed as the right of conquering soldiers.

The Ottoman siege cut virtually all means of food supply into Vienna. Fatigue became so common that Starhemberg ordered any soldier found asleep on watch to be shot. Increasingly desperate, the forces holding Vienna were on the verge of defeat when, in August, Imperial forces under Charles V, Duke of Lorraine, defeated Thököly at Bisamberg, 5 km (3.1 mi) northwest of Vienna.

On 6 September, the Poles under Sobieski crossed the Danube 30 km (19 mi) northwest of Vienna at Tulln, to unite with imperial troops and the additional forces from Saxony, Bavaria, Baden and other imperial estates. Louis XIV of France declined to help his Habsburg rival, having just annexed Alsace.

An alliance between Sobieski and Emperor Leopold I resulted in the addition of the Polish hussars to the existing allied army. The command of the European allied forces was assigned to the Polish king, renowned for his extensive experience in leading campaigns against the Ottoman army. Notably, he achieved a decisive victory over the Ottoman forces in the Battle of Khotyn (1673) and now commanded an army of 70,000–80,000 soldiers, countering an Ottoman force of around 35,000 men. (Note: 10,000-15,000 men were stationed at the defenses around Vienna to stop the garrison from counterattacking, leaving around 35,000-40,000 men to fight the relief army.)

During early September, approximately 5,000 experienced Ottoman sappers had repeatedly demolished large portions of the walls between the Burg bastion, the Löbel bastion and the Burg ravelin, creating gaps of about 12 metres (39 ft) in width. In response to this, the Viennese began digging their own tunnels to intercept the placing of large amounts of gunpowder in the caverns. The Ottomans finally managed to occupy the Burg ravelin and the low wall nearby on 8 September. Anticipating a breach in the city walls, the remaining Viennese prepared to fight in the inner city.

== Ottoman siege casualties (July 17–September 12, 1683) ==
The entire Ottoman Military's size and unit numbers
on paper in 1683 (Not all were present at Vienna)

A. Kapıkulu (household) Army	78,500
Janissary and cebeci (weaponeer) and gunner	60,000
Sipâh (Kapıkulu) (household cavalry)	15,000
Mısır Kulu (Men from Egypt)	3,000
Şam Kulu (Men from Damascus)	500

B. Tımarlı Sipahiler (provincial cavalry)	40,000

C. Kapı Halkları (governor's retinue)	44,200
8 viziers, three of them Tug-ed (banner)	19,300
Kara Mustafa Paşa	6,000
Janissary Agha Vizier Mustafa Pasha	2,000

D. Vassal States	100,000
Tatars	50,000
Wallachia	10,000
Moldavia	10,000
Transylvania	10,000
Middle Magyar (Thököly)	20,000

E. Rear Services	170,000
Clerk and janitor	20,000
Shepherd, animal driver, etc.	150,000

Total	432,700

In this table, only household and retinue troops’ numbers are certain, 78,500 and 44,200 while other troops’ numbers are rounded, 50,000 Tatars, 10,000 Wallachian, 170,000 rear service etc. Based on this, Kahraman Şakul claims that this anonymous table shows counted numbers of household and retinue troops while number of provincial troops (Tımarlı Sipahi: 40,000) and vassal states’ troops (100,000) are expected numbers. For instance, Tatars, Nogais and Circassians number was more than 100,000 while this table shows that the Tatars (general term for Crimean Khanate and its vassals) had around 50,000 total soldiers in their entire army.

Ottoman accounts state the size of the household army as 25,529 Janissaries, 3045 weaponeers (in Ottoman Turkish: cebeci) and 4000 gunners, totaling 32,574 as opposed to 60,000 estimation in this table. Therefore, according to K. Şakul's assessment, the Ottoman army consisted of approximately 120,000 soldiers and 156 guns. Within their ranks, 30,000 troops were strategically stationed in captured castles and deployed to disrupt the approaching relief army's movements.

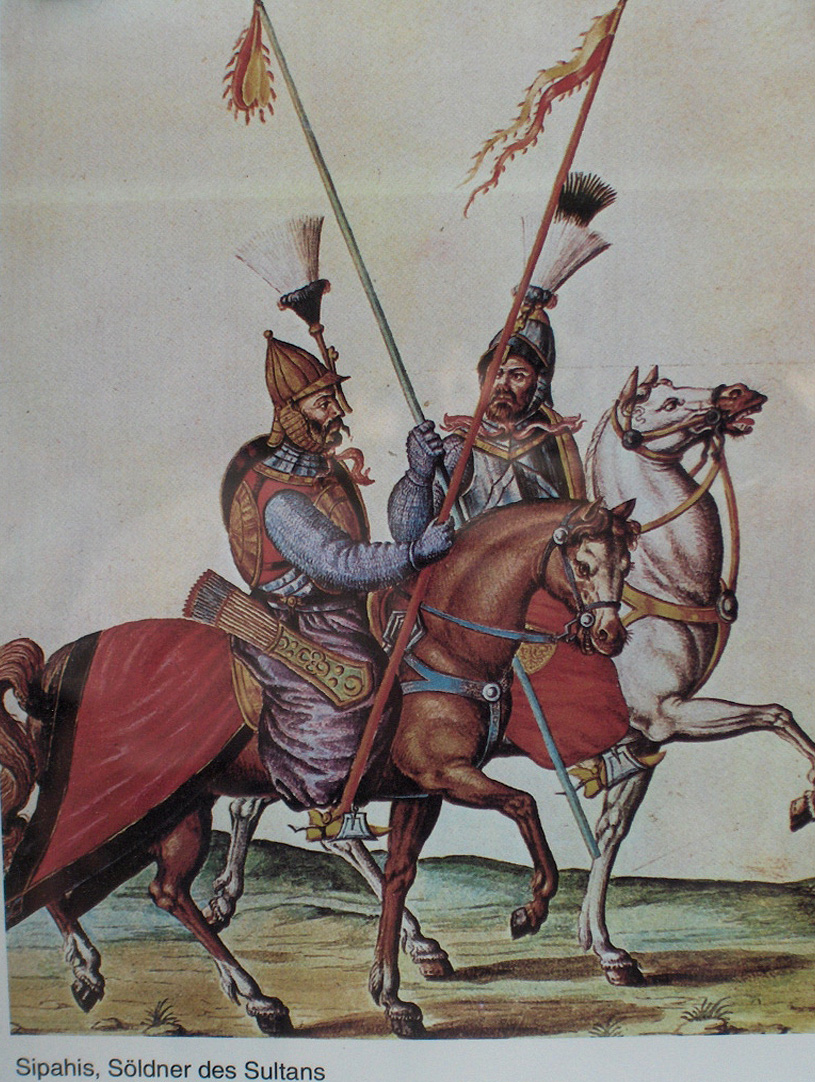
A depiction of Sipahis during the Battle of Vienna

According to Austrian Ambassador Kunitz, the besieging Ottoman army had already decreased to 90,000 combatants as of 12 August. Kunitz also claimed that he learned from Ottoman captives that casualties were reaching 20,000 by end of August (other Austrian sources give Ottoman casualties as 12,000 until 13 August, demonstrating a steady increase in casualties of the Ottoman army in the days of siege). An Ottoman account captured after battle recorded the number of casualties as 48,544 until 10 September: 10,000 janissary, 12,000 sipahi (elite heavy cavalry), 16,000 beldars (non-combatant helpers), 6,000 sappers/miners (lağımcı), 2,000 provincial sipahi and 2,000 Tatars, totaling 48,544 deaths. Compounding this, desertion (Ottoman sources and Luigi Marsigli give a 1/4 desertion of the Ottoman army) and disease diminished the Ottoman army on a large scale.

According to Ottoman sources, the number of soldiers decreased from 120,000 (according to Kunitz, the Ottoman army totalled 180,000 men and 1/3 of the army was stationed away from the siege) to a warweary 40,000 soldiers. K. Şakul combines Kunitz's 90,000 combatant information for 12 August with an Ottoman casualties list, estimating the Ottoman army as 90,000 men (65,000 soldiers, around 60 guns and 25,000 rear service) but Kunitz's 90,000 combatant information belongs to 12 August while the Ottoman list is for 10 September. The Ottoman vassals of Transylvania, Wallachia and Moldavia were assigned to hold bridges on key retreat routes, thus not participating in the battle. The Tatar vassals were expected to participate in battle by the Ottomans but the mostly irregular Tatar horsemen demonstrated little effectiveness in battle, dissimilar to previous engagements. A lone 28,400 to 50,000 Ottoman army would battle against the relief army consisting of 65,000 soldiers (68,000 misinformation is originated from counting the 3,000 Polish contingent twice joined to the relief army beforehand) with 165–200 guns.

== Staging the battle ==
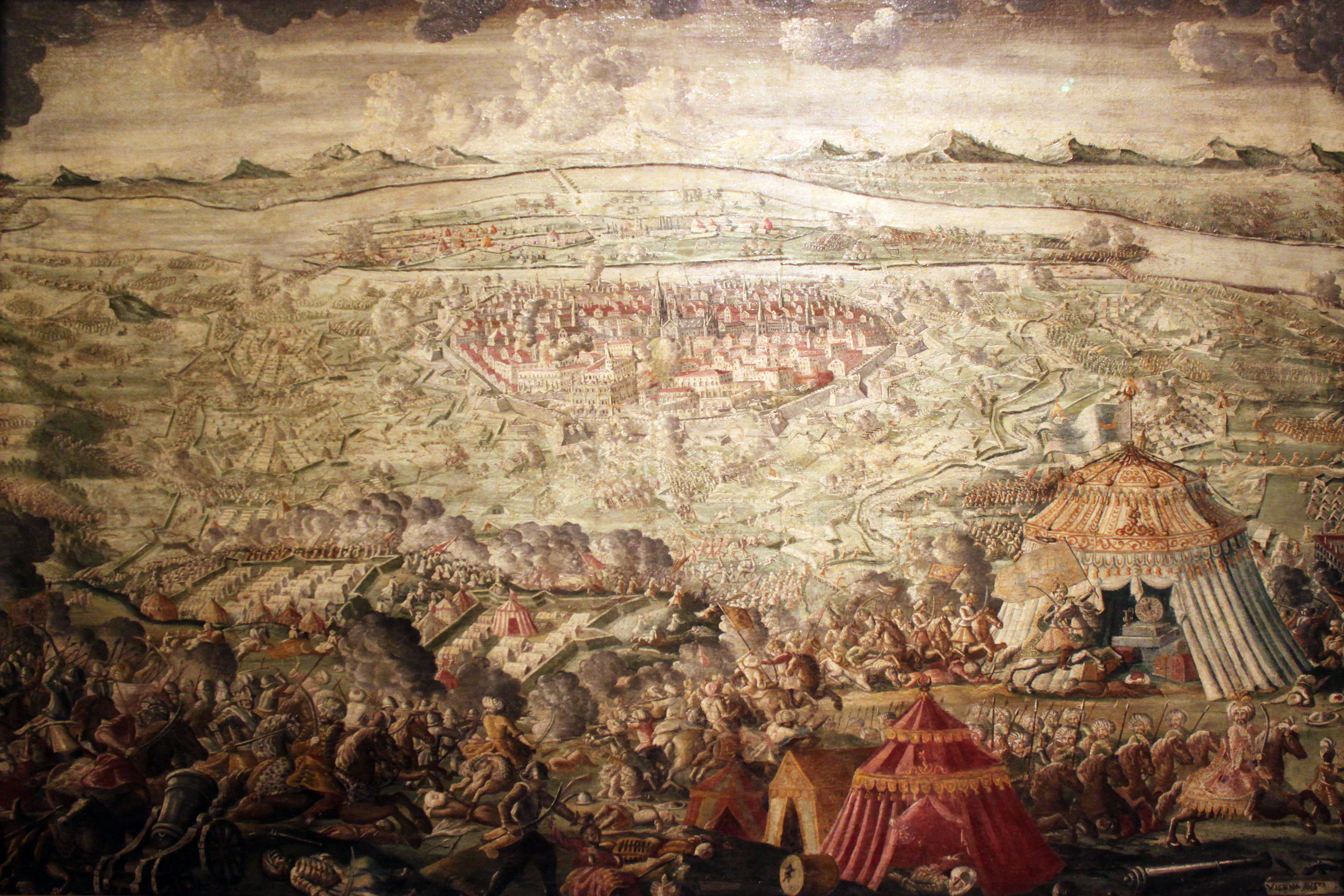
The relief of Vienna on 12 September 1683

In an effort to stop the siege, the relief army of Poles and Imperial forces rushed to prepare a response. Despite the multinational composition of the army and the short space of only six days, an effective leadership structure was established, centered around the king of Poland and his heavy cavalry (Polish Hussars). The issue of payment was settled by using all available funds from the government, loans from several wealthy bankers and noblemen and large sums of money from the Pope. The Habsburgs and Poles also agreed that the Polish government would pay for its own troops while still in Poland, but that the Emperor would fund them once they crossed into imperial territory. However, the Emperor recognized Sobieski's claim to first rights of plunder of the enemy camp in the event of a victory.

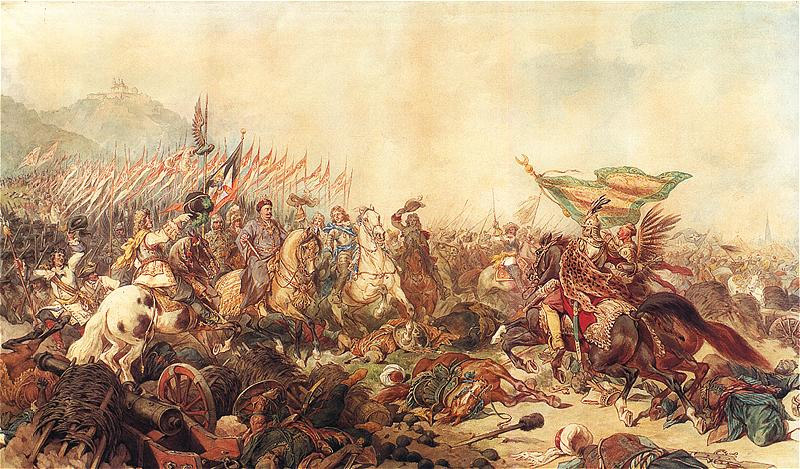
Sobieski at Vienna by Juliusz Kossak

The combined besieging forces, led by Kara Mustafa, were less united and facing problems with motivation and loyalty, and struggled to prepare for the expected relief-army attack. Mustafa entrusted defense of the rear to the Khan of Crimea and his cavalry force, which numbered between 30,000 and 40,000. There is doubt as to how much the Tatars participated in the final battle before Vienna. Their Khan refused to attack the relief force as it crossed the Danube on pontoon bridges, and also refused to attack them as they emerged from the Vienna Woods. The Ottoman allies of Wallachia and Moldavia also proved unreliable. George Ducas, Prince of Moldavia, was captured. Șerban Cantacuzino, who sympathized with the Christian Coalition, joined the retreat after Sobieski's cavalry charge. Cantacuzino had negotiated with the Imperial forces for Wallachia to join the Christian side, longing for the position of protector of Christians in the Balkan Peninsula. In turn, the Habsburgs promised him the throne of Constantinople which was the capital of the Ottoman Empire.

The confederated troops signaled their arrival on the Kahlenberg above Vienna with bonfires. The forces in the city of Vienna responded by sending Jerzy Franciszek Kulczycki, a Polish nobleman, diplomat and trader fluent in Turkish, on a successful spy mission to penetrate the Turkish forces and notify the relief troops of when the joint attack was to be made.

== Battle ==
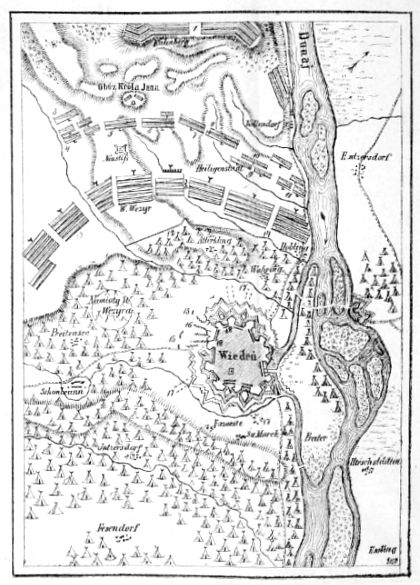
The position of the allied armies (north), the besieged Vienna (middle), and the Ottoman army (between them) during the battle

The battle started before all units were fully deployed. At 4:00 am on 12 September, the Ottoman army attacked, seeking to interfere with the deployment of allied troops. The Germans were the first to counterattack. Charles of Lorraine moved forward with the imperial army on the left and other imperial forces in the center and, after heavy fighting and multiple Ottoman counterattacks, took several key positions, in particular the fortified villages of Nussdorf and Heiligenstadt. By midday, the imperial army had inflicted significant damage on the Ottoman forces and came close to a breakthrough. At the same time, Cantacuzino and his soldiers (who secretly supported the Christian coalition) were trying to sabotage the Ottoman siege, by abandoning the bridge over the Danube on Brigittenau Island, where the Wallachians had been stationed in order to cover the left flank of the Ottoman Army. Mustafa Pasha launched counterattacks with most of his forces, but held back some of the elite Janissary and Sipahi units for a simultaneous assault on the city. The Ottoman leadership had planned, but ultimately failed, to capture Vienna prior to the arrival of Sobieski's forces. Their sappers had prepared a large, final detonation under the Löbelbastei to breach the walls. In total, ten mines were set to explode, but they were located by the defenders and disarmed.

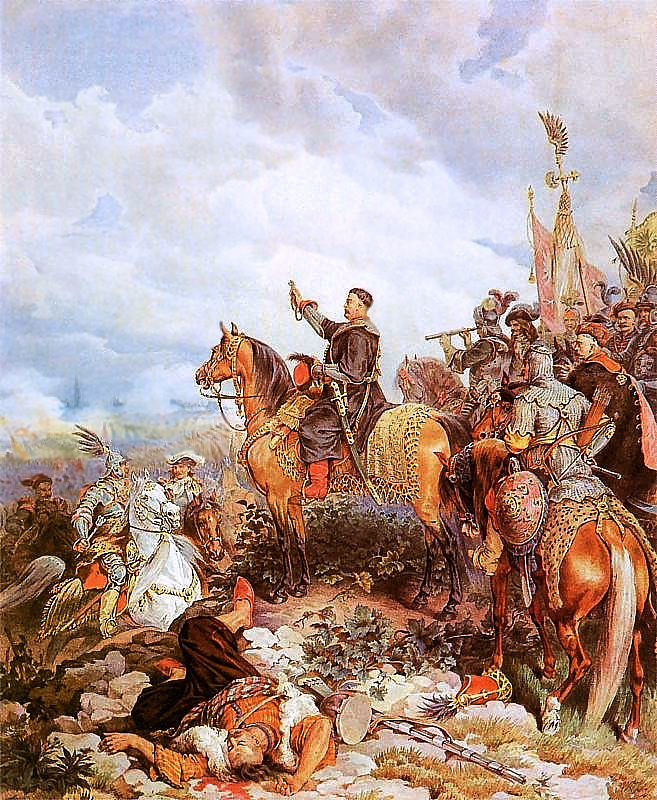
King John III Sobieski blessing the Polish attack on the Ottomans in the Battle of Vienna; painting by Juliusz Kossak

In the early afternoon, a large engagement started on the other side of the battlefield as the Polish infantry advanced on the Ottoman right flank. Despite the arrival of the relief army, several parts of the Ottoman forces persisted in their attempts to breach the city's defenses, allowing Polish troops to advance on the field. By 4:00 pm the Poles had captured the village of Gersthof, which would serve as a base for their cavalry charge. The Ottoman army was in a desperate position between Polish and Imperial forces. Charles of Lorraine and John III Sobieski both decided independently to press the offensive and decisively defeat the Ottoman forces.

The German forces resumed the offensive on the left front at 3:30 pm. At first, they encountered fierce resistance and were unable to make progress. However, by 5:00 pm they had begun to advance and taken the villages of Unterdöbling and Oberdöbling. Imperial forces closed in on the central Ottoman position (the "Türkenschanze", now the Türkenschanzpark), and as they made preparations for a final push, the Polish cavalry began to take action.

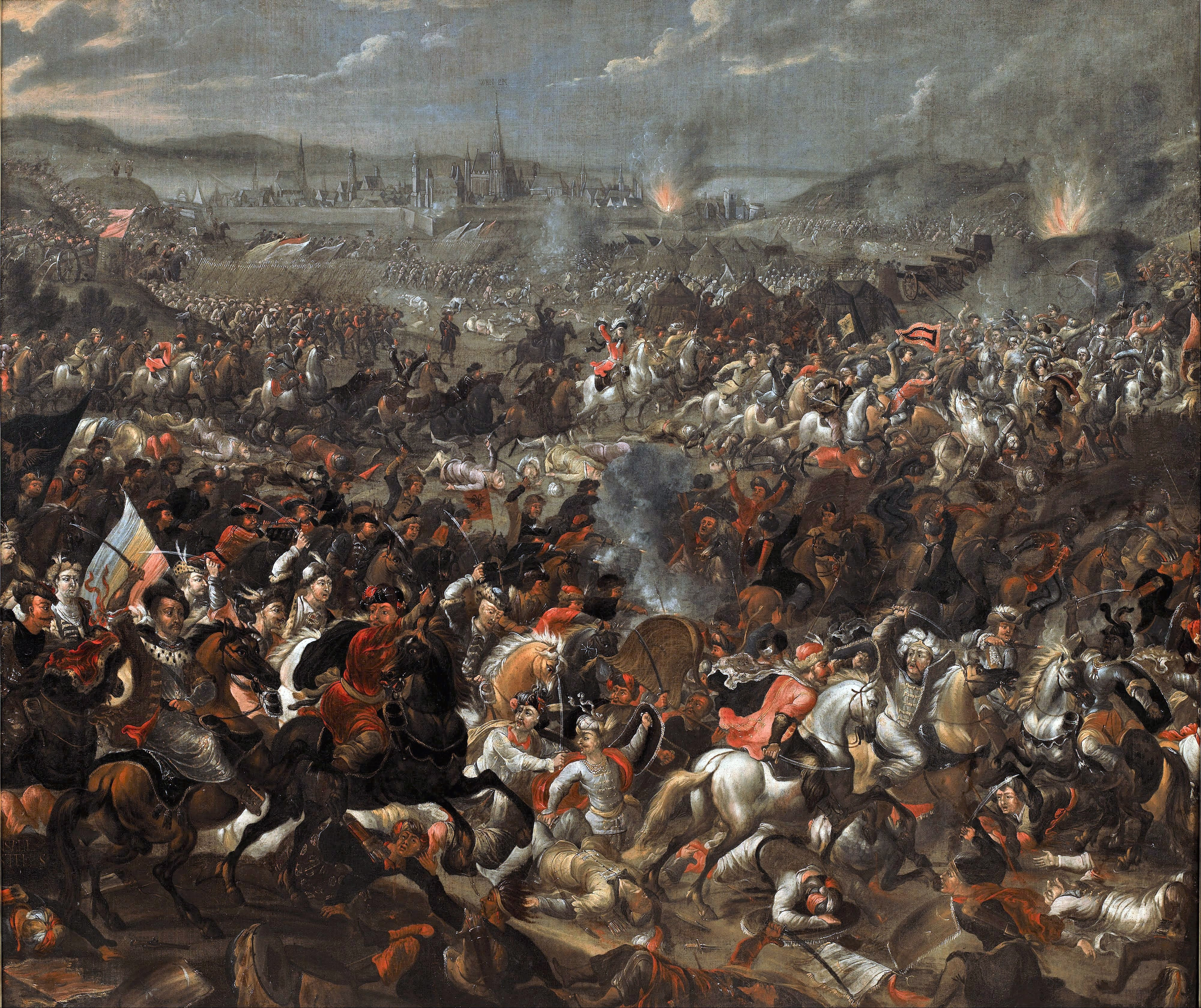
Battle of Vienna, painting by Gonzales Franciscus Casteels

It is recorded that the Polish cavalry slowly emerged from a nearby forest to the cheers of onlooking infantry, which had been anticipating their arrival. At 4:00 pm, a detachment of 120 hussars engaged in a probing charge, successfully proving Ottoman vulnerability to attack but taking many casualties. During this action, they began to approach the Türkenschanze, which was now threatened by three separate forces (the Poles from the west, the Saxons and Bavarians from the northwest and the Austrians from the north). At this point, the Ottoman vizier left this position and retreated to his headquarters in the main camp further south. However, by then many Ottoman soldiers were already leaving the battlefield.

The relief army was now ready for a final push. At around 6:00 pm, the Polish king ordered the cavalry to attack in four contingents, three Polish groups and one from the Holy Roman Empire. 18,000 horsemen charged down the hills, the largest cavalry charge in history. Sobieski led the charge at the head of 3,000 Polish heavy lancers, the "Winged Hussars". Lipka Tatars who participated on the Polish side wore a sprig of straw in their helmets to distinguish them from the tatars fighting on the Ottoman side. The charge quickly broke the battle lines of the Ottomans, who were already exhausted and demoralized and began to retreat from the battlefield. The cavalry headed directly towards the Ottoman camps and Kara Mustafa's headquarters, while the remaining Viennese garrison sallied out of its defenses to join in the assault.

The Ottoman forces were tired and dispirited following the failure of the sapping attempt, the assault on the city and the advance of the allied infantry on the Türkenschanze. Less than three hours after the decisive cavalry charge, the allied forces had won the battle and successfully defended Vienna. The first Catholic officer who entered the city was Louis William, Margrave of Baden-Baden, at the head of his dragoons. Afterwards Sobieski paraphrased Julius Caesar's famous quotation (Veni, vidi, vici) by saying "Venimus, vidimus, Deus vicit" – "We came, we saw, God conquered".

== Atrocities ==
During the Siege of Vienna, the Ottoman troops pillaged the surrounding countryside and took many surviving civilians into slavery in the Ottoman Empire. In the village of Perchtoldsdorf outside of Vienna, the Ottomans massacred the men and enslaved the women and children.

The villagers of Perchtoldsdorf had resisted the invasion and barricaded themselves in a church fortress. The Ottomans promised they would safeguard the villagers’ lives and property in exchange for their capitulation. Upon surrendering, however, the Ottomans gathered the men of the village in the market square, took their weapons, and massacred them; they captured the women and children and, as kafir war prisoners of dar al-harb, took them away as slaves.

Normally, the Ottomans killed adult men and preferred to enslave women and children, but men were enslaved as well. In total, 57,220 people were kidnapped and taken away as slaves during the Ottoman pillage of the Austrian and Hungarian border zone in 1683: 6,000 men, 11,215 married women, 14,922 unmarried women under the age of 26 (of which 204 were noblewomen), and 26,093 children.

== Aftermath ==
Contemporary Ottoman historian Silahdar Findiklili Mehmed Agha (1658–1723) described the battle as an enormous defeat and failure for the Ottoman Empire, the most disastrous since the foundation of Ottoman statehood in 1299. The Ottomans lost at least 20,000 men during the siege, while their losses during the battle with Sobieski's forces amounted to around 15,000 dead (according to Podhorodecki) or 8,000–15,000 dead and 5,000–10,000 captured (according to Tucker). Casualties of the relief force under Sobieski's command were much smaller, amounting to approximately 3,500 dead and wounded, including 1,300 Poles. Tucker's estimate is slightly higher: 4,500. The 10,000 strong Viennese garrison and the civilian populace lost, due to all causes, about half of their initial number during the siege.

The allied troops and the Viennese took a large amount of loot from the Ottoman army, which Sobieski described in a letter to his wife a few days after the battle:

Ours are treasures unheard of ... tents, sheep, cattle and no small number of camels ... it is a victory as nobody ever knew before, the enemy now completely ruined, everything lost for them. They must run for their sheer lives ... General Starhemberg hugged and kissed me and called me his saviour.

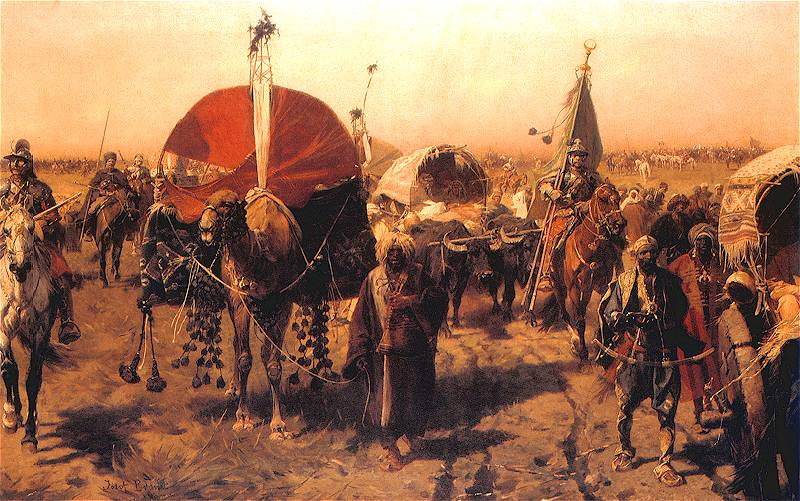
Return from Vienna by Józef Brandt, Polish army returning with Ottoman loot

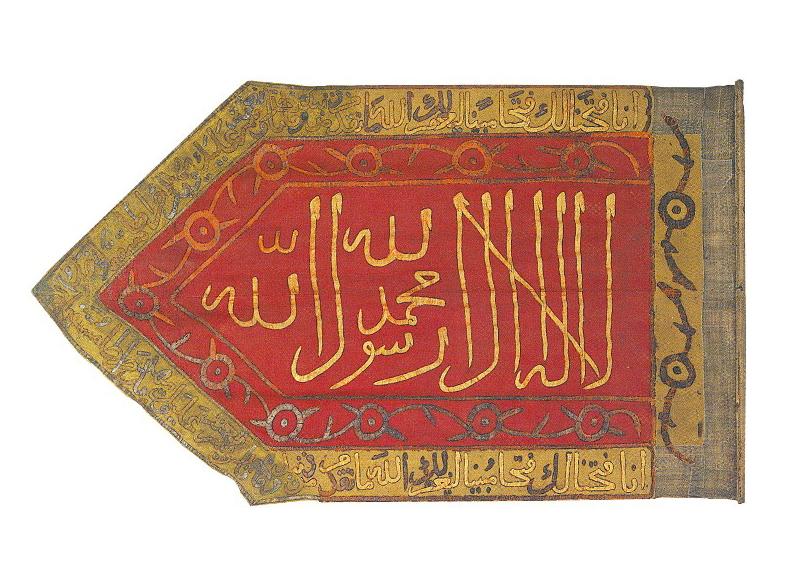
Ottoman military flag captured in the siege of Vienna

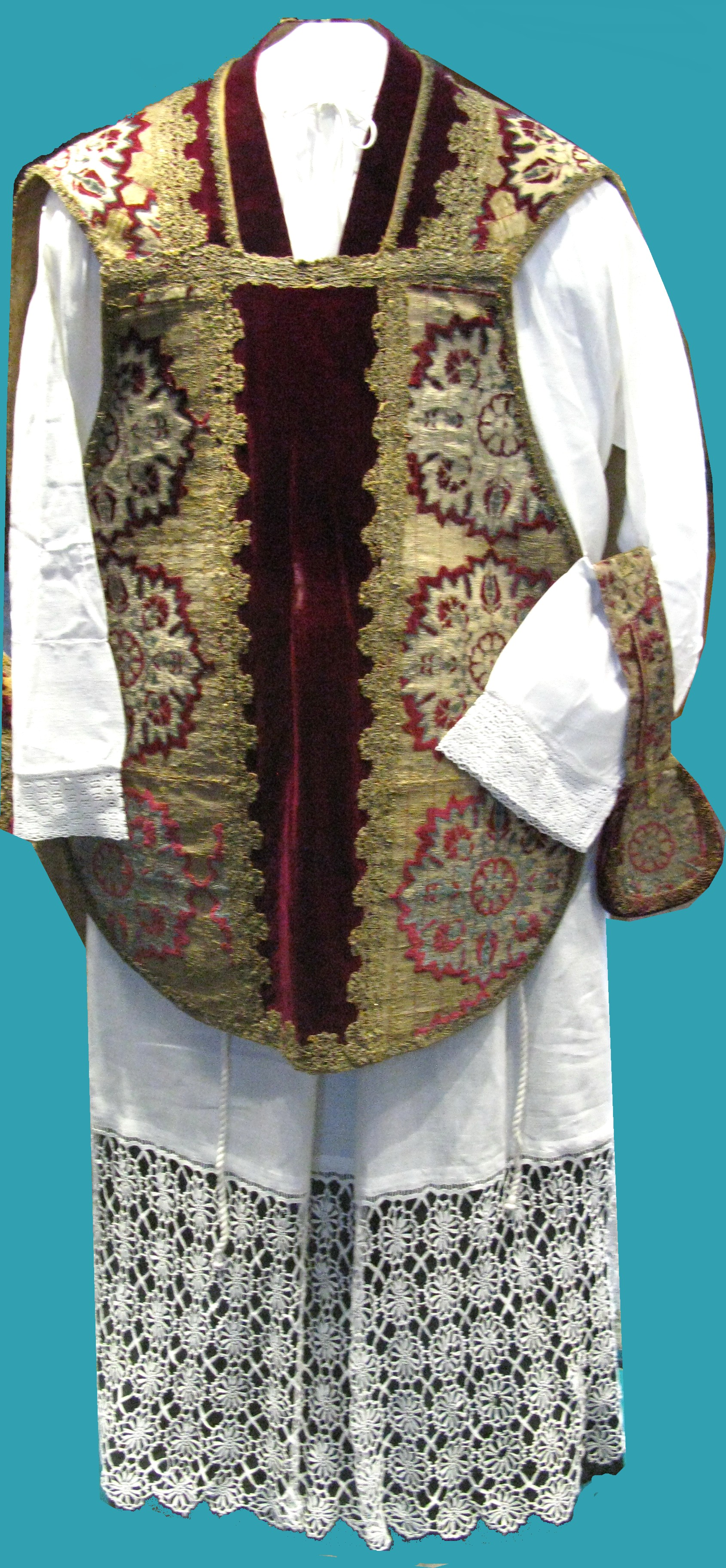
Chasuble sewn with Turkish tents captured by the Polish army in Vienna, 1683

Starhemberg immediately ordered the repair of Vienna's severely damaged fortifications to guard against a possible Ottoman counterstrike. However, Vienna would never again be besieged by the Ottoman Empire.

Due to his defeat at the battle, on 25 December Kara Mustafa Pasha was executed in Belgrade in the approved manner – by strangulation with a silk rope pulled by several men on each end – by order of the Janissary Agha."

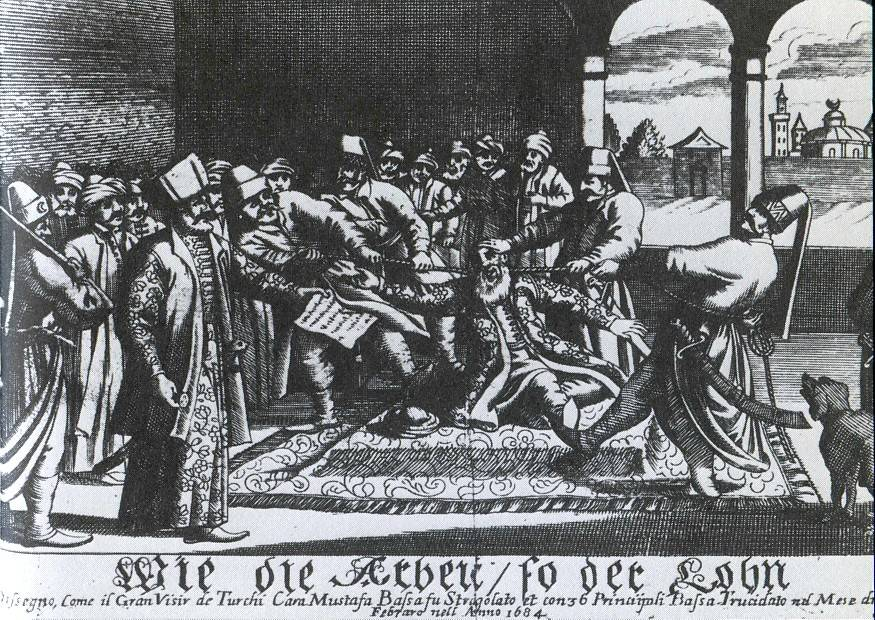
Kara Mustafa Pasha's strangulation by a silk cord on 25 December 1683.

Despite the victory of the Catholic allies, there was still tension among the various commanders and their armies. Sobieski demanded that Polish troops be allowed to have the first choice of the spoils of the Ottoman camp, and thus German and Austrian troops were left with smaller portions of the loot. Further, Protestant Saxons, who had arrived to relieve the city, were reportedly subjected to verbal abuse by the Catholic populace of the Viennese countryside. The Saxons left the battle immediately, without partaking in the sharing of spoils, and refused to continue the pursuit.

Sobieski went on to liberate Esztergom and northwestern Hungary after the Battle of Parkany, but dysentery halted his pursuit of the Ottomans. Charles V of Lorraine captured Buda and most of Hungary in 1686, establishing Habsburg control over southern Hungary and most of Transylvania in 1687 and capturing Belgrade in 1688.

The Ottoman defeat at Vienna sparked great celebrations in Safavid Iran; the report was apparently brought in such a spectacular way, that then incumbent Emperor (Shah) Suleiman I (r. 1666–1694) considered a march to Baghdad, which had been lost in 1639 to the Ottomans by virtue of the Treaty of Zuhab. Ultimately, the Safavids would not conduct a new campaign, for concerned state officials (notably the dominant eunuch faction within the royal court) were aware of the decline in Safavid military strength, and thus did not consider it prudent. The eunuchs, according to Professor Rudi Matthee "were not against the idea of having the Ottomans suffer some humiliation, but they did not want their power destroyed for fear that this would remove a buffer against Christian Europe".

== Significance ==
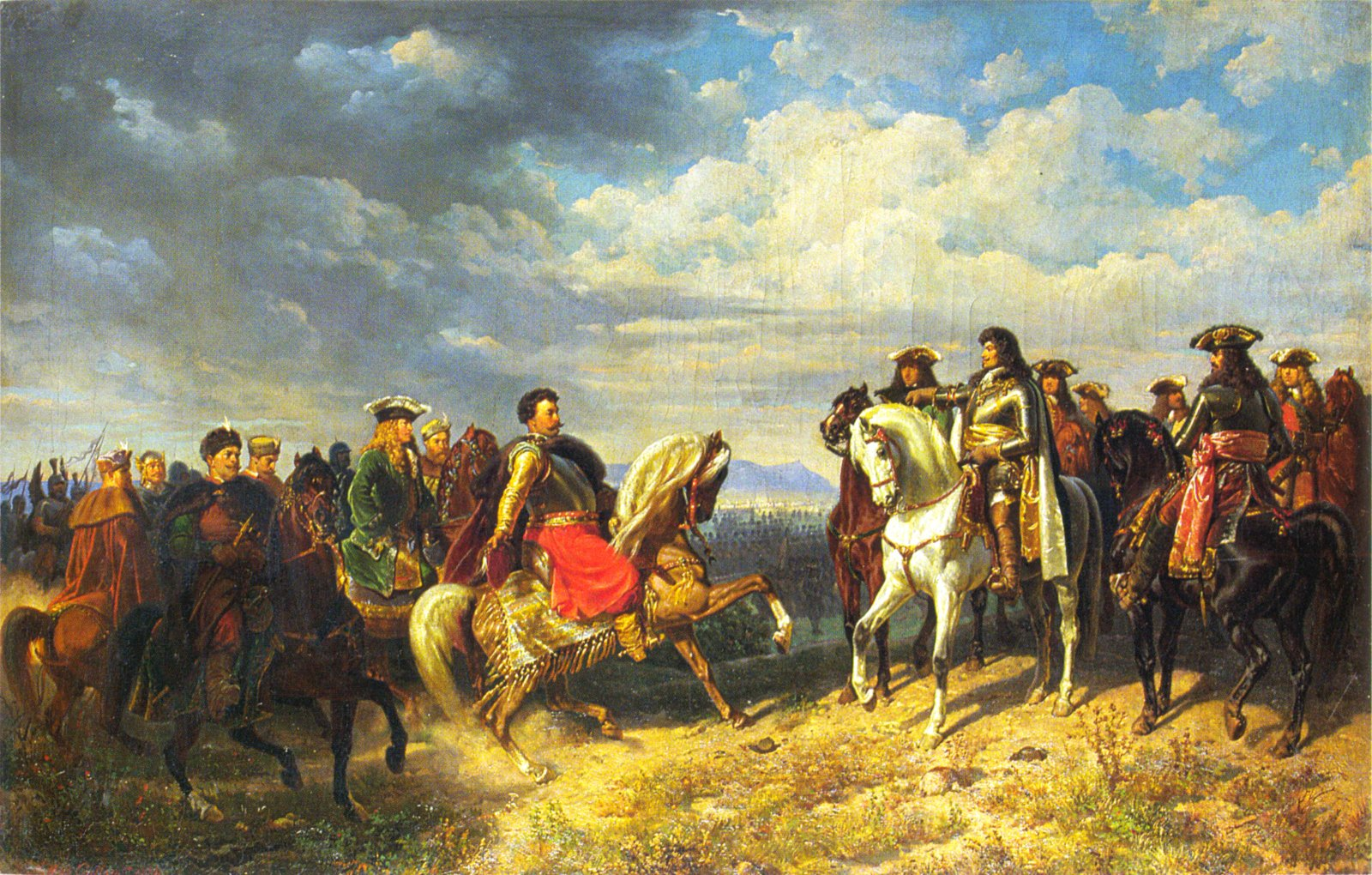
Sobieski meeting Leopold I, by Artur Grottger

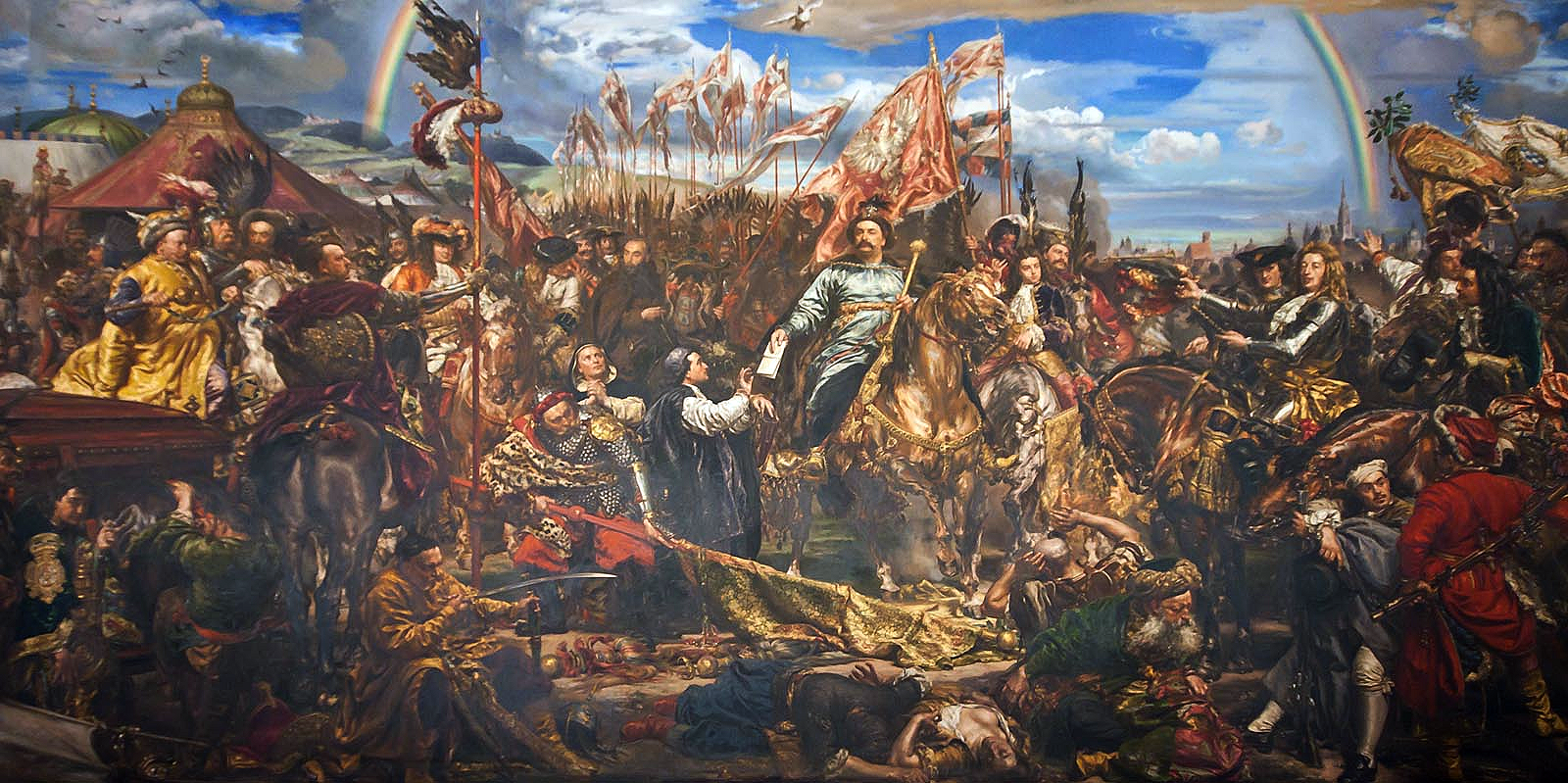
Sobieski Sending Message of Victory to the Pope, by Jan Matejko

The victory at Vienna set the stage for a conquest of Hungary and (temporarily) lands in the Balkans in the following years by Louis of Baden, Maximilian II Emanuel of Bavaria and Prince Eugene of Savoy. The Ottomans fought on for another 16 years, eventually losing control of Hungary and Transylvania. The Holy Roman Empire signed the Treaty of Karlowitz with the Ottoman Empire in 1699, which would cede much of Hungary to the Habsburgs. The battle marked the historic end of Ottoman expansion into Europe. The actions of Louis XIV of France furthered French–German enmity; in the following month, the War of the Reunions broke out in the western part of the weakened Holy Roman Empire.

Since Sobieski had entrusted his kingdom to the protection of the Blessed Virgin (Our Lady of Częstochowa) before the battle, Pope Innocent XI commemorated his victory by extending the feast of the Holy Name of Mary, which until then had been celebrated solely in Spain and the Kingdom of Naples, to the entire Church; it used to be celebrated on the Sunday within the Octave of the Nativity of Mary (between 9 and 15 September) and was, when Pope Pius X intended to make room for the celebration of the actual Sundays, transferred to 12 September, the day of the victory. The Pope would change the papal coat of arms by adding the Polish crowned White Eagle. After victory in the Battle of Vienna, the Polish king was also granted by the Pope the title of "Defender of the Faith" ("Defensor Fidei"). In honor of Sobieski, the Austrians erected a church atop the Kahlenberg hill north of Vienna. In 2024, the city of Vienna rejected a monument to King Jan Sobieski due to concerns about Islamophobia and anti-Turkish sentiment.

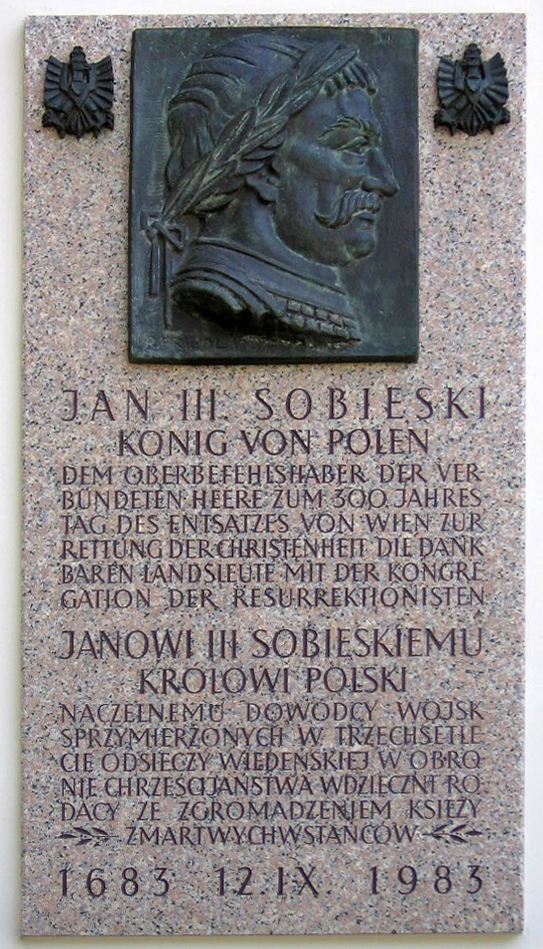
Plaque at the Polish Congregatio Resurrectionis church on Kahlenberg

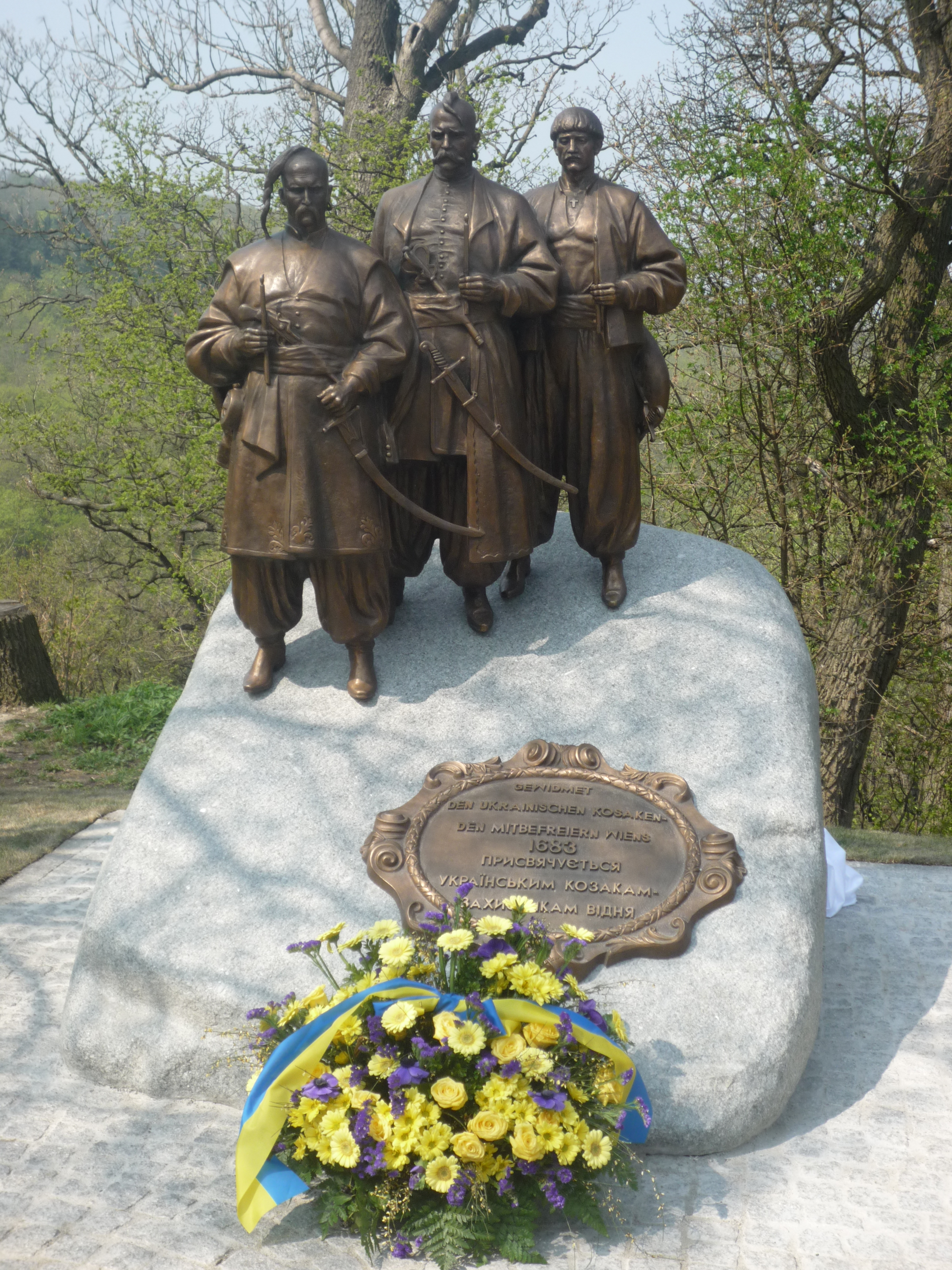
Monoument to the Zaporozhian Cossacks in Leopoldsberg, Vienna

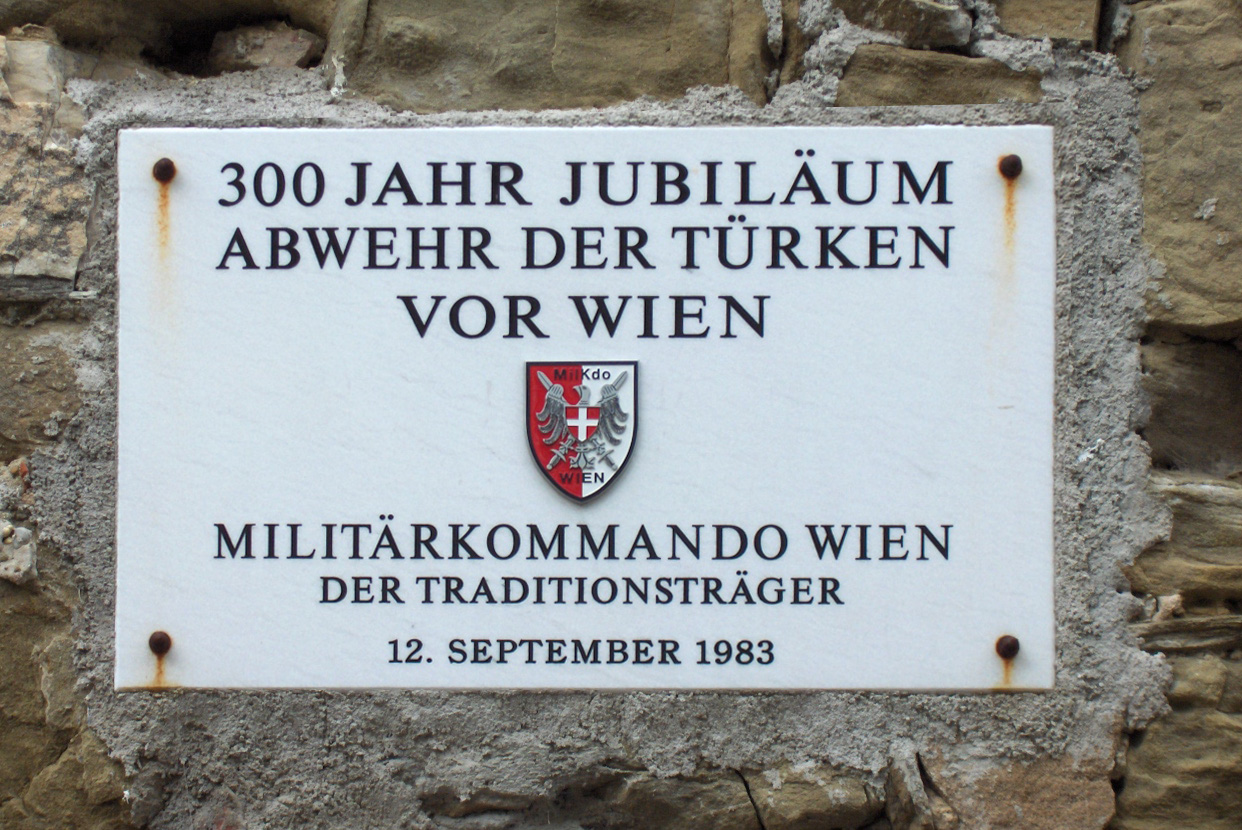
Plaque memorializing the 300th anniversary of the successful defense against the Ottomans at the gates of Vienna

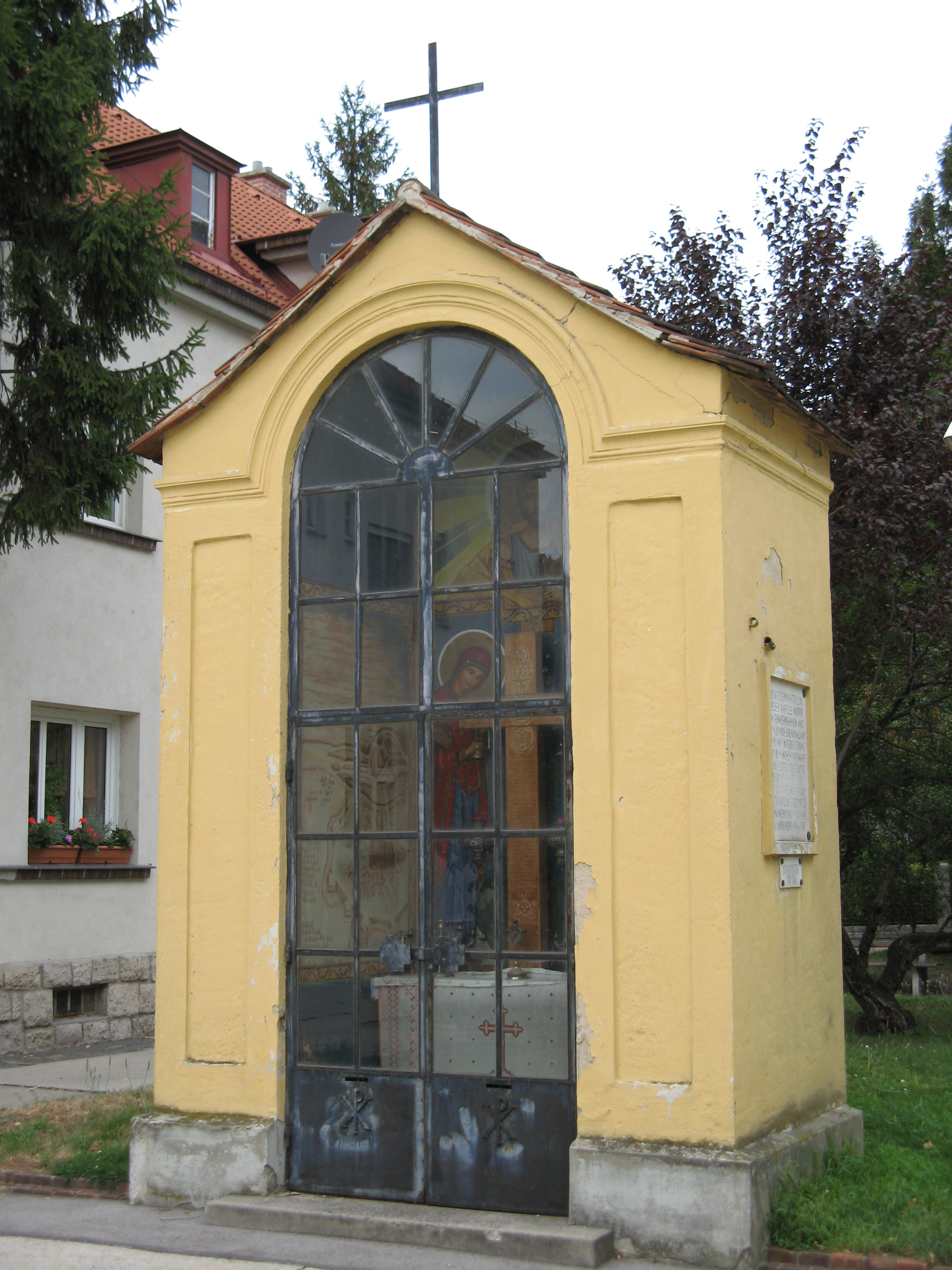
The Moldauer Kapelle housing a replica of Cantacuzino's cross

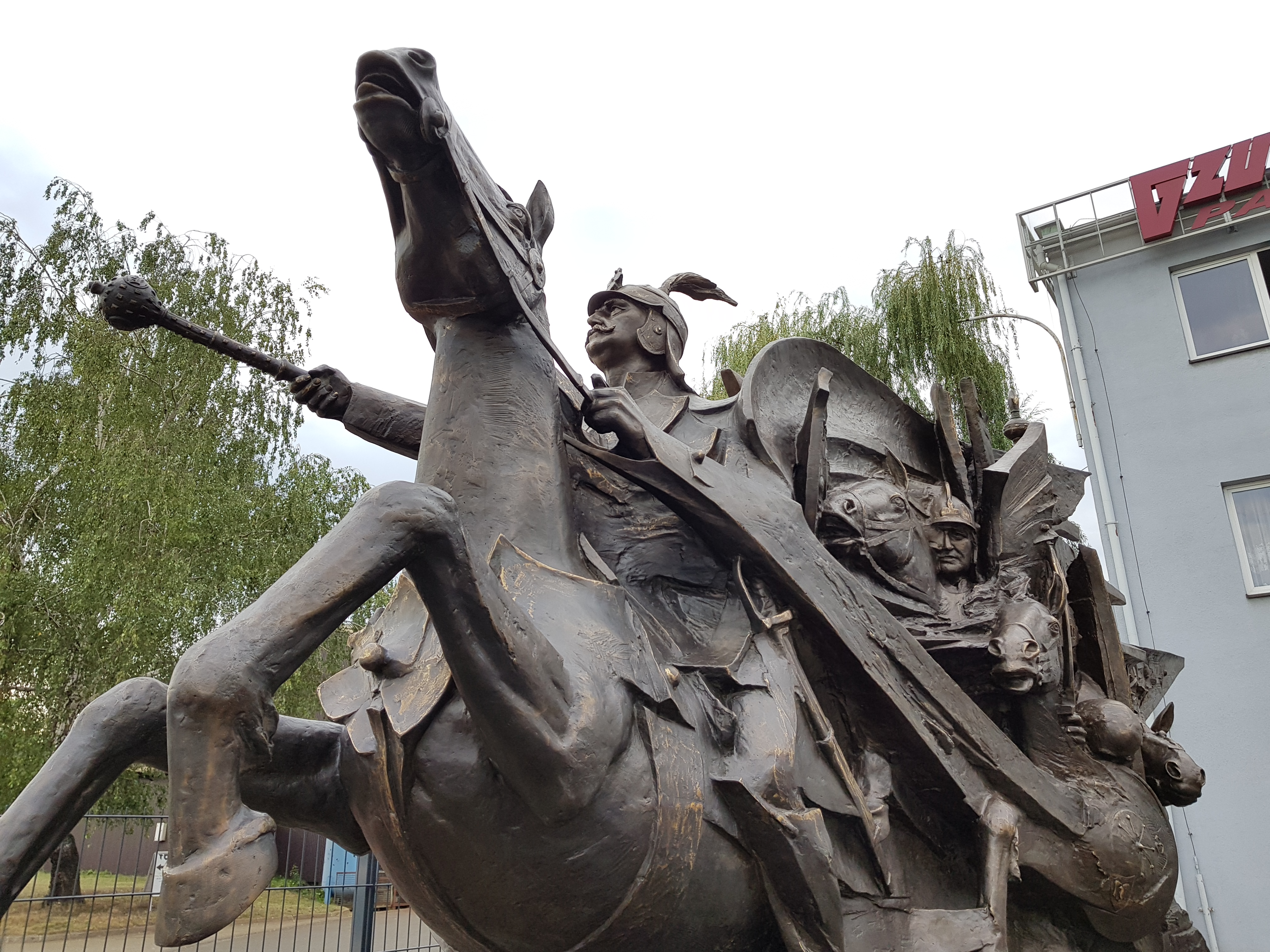
Monument to King Sobieski in Poland, by Czesław Dźwigaj

=== September 11 attacks ===
Some have proposed that Al-Qaeda chose September 11, 2001 as the date to carry out terrorist attacks throughout the United States due to the day's perceived significance as the turning point in the Battle of Vienna. According to Lawrence Wright, September 11, 1683 was seen by Al-Qaeda as the date when the Western world gained dominance over Islam; the 11th of September 318 years later would mark a rebirth of Islamic power.

== In popular culture ==
- Siege of Vienna raised by John Sobieski, poem by William Wordsworth written in February 1816.
- The Day of the Siege: September Eleven 1683, a 2012 English-language Polish and Italian historical film.
- The song "Winged Hussars", from Sabaton's 2016 album The Last Stand is about the battle, specifically centred around the Polish cavalry charge on 12 September.

== See also ==
- Great Turkish War
- History of Vienna
- Ottoman wars in Europe
- Scutum: a constellation named in 1684 in reference to the battle
- The Day of the Siege: September Eleven 1683, a 2012 English-language Polish and Italian historical drama film based on the Battle of Vienna and directed by Renzo Martinelli
