= Battle of Vienna order of battle =

The following units and commanders fought in the Battle of Vienna of the Great Turkish War in 1683.

== Catholic forces outside Vienna (until 14 July) ==
- Commander-in-Chief: Charles V, Duke of Lorraine

Catholic forces outside the city
Type	Strength
Infantry	21,000
Cavalry	11,000
Hungarians (led by Paul I, Prince Esterházy)	5,000

Total - 37,000 men

== Catholic forces inside Vienna (14 July - 12 September) ==
=== Inside the city ===
- Commander-in-Chief: Ernst Rüdiger von Starhemberg
  - Generalfeldwachtmeister Wilhelm Johann Anton Graf von Daun
  - Generalfeldwachtmeister Karl Ludwig Graf de Souches
  - Generalfeldwachtmeister Johann Karl Graf von Serenyi
  - Generalfeldwachtmeister Friedrich Siegmund Graf von Schärffenberg

Total - c. 12,000 or 14,163 men (including city militia)

Catholic forces inside the city
Type	Commander	Unit	Subdivisions (companies)	Strength
Infantry (72/73 regular companies)		Theim Infantry Regiment	3	10,603
Infantry (72/73 regular companies)		Pfalz-Neuberg Infantry Regiment	5	10,603
Infantry (72/73 regular companies)		Souches Infantry Regiment	10	10,603
Infantry (72/73 regular companies)		Schärffenberg Infantry Regiment	10	10,603
Infantry (72/73 regular companies)		Beck Infantry Regiment	7	10,603
Infantry (72/73 regular companies)		Heister Infantry Regiment	5	10,603
Infantry (72/73 regular companies)		Württemberg Infantry Regiment	5	10,603
Infantry (72/73 regular companies)		Mansfeld Infantry Regiment	10	10,603
Infantry (72/73 regular companies)		Kaiserstein Infantry Regiment	5	10,603
Infantry (72/73 regular companies)		Starhemberg Infantry Regiment	10	10,603
City guard/militia	Oberstwachtmeister Ferdinand Dominik Marchese degli Obizzi		8	4,900
Cavalry		Dupigny (ex-Dampierre) Cuirassier Regiment	9	600
Artillery	Oberst von Borner			
Artillery	Oberstlieutnant von Peekstein			

=== Field army at Leopoldstadt ===
- Commander-in-Chief: Charles V, Duke of Lorraine

Catholic forces outside the city
Type	Commander	Unit	Strength (companies)
Imperial Cuirassier Regiments		Capara (Caprara) Cuirassier Regiment	10
Imperial Cuirassier Regiments		Montecuccoli Cuirassier Regiment	10
Imperial Cuirassier Regiments		Taff (Taaffe) Cuirassier Regiment	10
Imperial Cuirassier Regiments		Rabatta Cuirassier Regiment	10
Imperial Cuirassier Regiments		Dunewald (Dunnewald) Cuirassier Regiment	10
Imperial Cuirassier Regiments		Palffy Cuirassier Regiment	10
Imperial Cuirassier Regiments		Mercy Cuirassier Regiment	10
Imperial Cuirassier Regiments		Hallewyl (Halleweil) Cuirassier Regiment	10
Imperial Cuirassier Regiments		Gondola Cuirassier Regiment	10
Imperial Cuirassier Regiments		Götz Cuirassier Regiment	10
Imperial Dragoon Regiments		Schulz Dragoon Regiment	10
Imperial Dragoon Regiments		Styrum Dragoon Regiment	10
Imperial Dragoon Regiments		Küffstein Dragoon Regiment	10
Imperial Dragoon Regiments		Savoyen Dragoon Regiment	10
Imperial Dragoon Regiments		Herbeville Dragoon Regiment	10
Croatian Regiments		Nikolaus Lodron Croaten Regiment	
Croatian Regiments		Kery Croaten Regiment	
Croatian Regiments		Receardi Croaten Regiment	

== Catholic Coalition relief force at the Battle of Kahlenberg ==
- Commander-in-chief: King John III Sobieski, King of Poland and Grand Duke of Lithuania

=== Organization ===
Catholic Coalition forces in the Battle of Kahlenberg
Wing	Corps
Left Wing Charles V, Duke of Lorraine	1st Imperial and Saxon Corps of Infantry Albert von Caprara
Left Wing Charles V, Duke of Lorraine	2nd Imperial and Saxon Corps of Infantry Prince Hermann of Baden-Baden
Left Wing Charles V, Duke of Lorraine	Saxon Corps John George III, Elector of Saxony
Left Wing Charles V, Duke of Lorraine	Saxon Cavalry Corps Hieronim Augustyn Lubomirski
Left Wing Charles V, Duke of Lorraine	Polish Cavalry Corps Hieronim Augustyn Lubomirski
Center Prince Georg Friedrich of Waldeck	Franconian and Swabian Circles Infantry Corps Prince Georg Friedrich of Waldeck
Center Prince Georg Friedrich of Waldeck	Bavarian Infantry Corps Hannibal von Degenfeld
Center Prince Georg Friedrich of Waldeck	Imperial & Bavarian Cavalry Corps Antonio Caraffa
Right Wing Great Crown Hetman Stanisław Jan Jabłonowski	Polish Infantry Corps Marcin Kazimierz Kątski
Right Wing Great Crown Hetman Stanisław Jan Jabłonowski	1st Polish Cavalry Corps Stanisław Jan Jabłonowski
Right Wing Great Crown Hetman Stanisław Jan Jabłonowski	Imperial and Saxon Cavalry Corps Julius Francis, Duke of Saxe-Lauenburg
Right Wing Great Crown Hetman Stanisław Jan Jabłonowski	Royal Guard "Reiter" Corps Aleksander Polanowski

==== Imperial troop units ====
Total:

- 8,100 foot [less Beck]
- 12,900 horse

Imperial troops in the campaign, but those not at the battle are not included in the total figures.

Engaged Imperial troops
Type	Commander	Unit	Strength
Imperial Infantry Regiments		Grana Infantry Regiment	2 bns less one company
Imperial Infantry Regiments		Baden Infantry Regiment	2 bns
Imperial Infantry Regiments		Leslie Infantry Regiment	1 bn
Imperial Infantry Regiments		Croy Infantry Regiment	1 bn
Imperial Infantry Regiments		Thimb Infantry Regiment	1 bn
Imperial Infantry Regiments		Württemberg-Neustädt Infantry Regiment	1 bn
Imperial Infantry Regiments		Neuburg Infantry Regiment	1 bn
Imperial Infantry Regiments		Beck Infantry Regiment (attached to Bavarians during the battle)	1 bn
Imperial Cuirassier Regiments		Capara Cuirassier Regiment	10 coys
Imperial Cuirassier Regiments		Montecuccoli Cuirassier Regiment	10 coys
Imperial Cuirassier Regiments		Taaffe Cuirassier Regiment	10 coys
Imperial Cuirassier Regiments		Rabatta Cuirassier Regiment	10 coys
Imperial Cuirassier Regiments		Dunewald Cuirassier Regiment	10 coys
Imperial Cuirassier Regiments		Palffy Cuirassier Regiment	10 coys
Imperial Cuirassier Regiments		Piccolomini Cuirassier Regiment	10 coys
Imperial Cuirassier Regiments		Caraffa Cuirassier Regiment	10 coys
Imperial Cuirassier Regiments		Mercy Cuirassier Regiment	10 coys
Imperial Cuirassier Regiments		Veterani Cuirassier Regiment	10 coys
Imperial Cuirassier Regiments		Hallewyl Cuirassier Regiment	10 coys
Imperial Cuirassier Regiments		Sachsen-Lauenburg Cuirassier Regiment	10 coys
Imperial Cuirassier Regiments		Gondola Cuirassier Regiment	10 coys
Imperial Cuirassier Regiments		Götz Cuirassier Regiment	10 coys
Imperial Dragoon Regiments		Schulz Dragoon Regiment	10 coys
Imperial Dragoon Regiments		Lymburg-Styrum Dragoon Regiment	10 coys
Imperial Dragoon Regiments		Küffstein Dragoon Regiment	10 coys
Imperial Dragoon Regiments		Heissler Dragoon Regiment	10 coys
Croatian & Polish cavalry		Kery Croatian Horse Regiment	8 coys
Croatian & Polish cavalry		Lubomirski Polish Cuirassier Group	
Croatian & Polish cavalry		Lubomirski Polish Dragoon Group	
Artillery			70 guns, including many regimental guns

Imperial troops in the campaign but not in the battle
Type	Commander	Unit	Strength
Imperial Infantry Regiments		Wallis Infantry Regiment	2 bns
Imperial Infantry Regiments		Salm Infantry Regiment	2 bns
Imperial Infantry Regiments		Lothringen Infantry Regiment	2 bns
Imperial Infantry Regiments		Dieppenthal Infantry Regiment	1 bn
Imperial Infantry Regiments		Heister Infantry Regiment	1 bn
Imperial Infantry Regiments		Thugen (Würzburg) Mercenary Infantry Regiment	
Imperial Cuirassier Regiment		Truchess (Würzburg) Mercenary Cuirassier Regiment	
Imperial Dragoon Regiments		Herbeville Dragoon Regiment	
Imperial Dragoon Regiments		Teutin Dragoon Regiment	

==== Bavarians ====
Commander: Generalfeldmarschall-Leutnant Hannibal von Degenfeld

Total of Bavarians (discounting attached Imperial soldiers) - 8,400

Bavarian troops
Type	Brigade	Commander	Unit	Subdivisions	Strength
Bavarian Infantry Regiments			Berlo (later Mercy) Infantry Regiment		4,800
Bavarian Infantry Regiments			Degenfeld Infantry Regiment		4,800
Bavarian Infantry Regiments			Steinau Infantry Regiment		4,800
Bavarian Infantry Regiments			Preysing Infantry Regiment (replaced the Perouse Inf. Rgt. on 15 July)		4,800
Bavarian Cavalry Regiments	GWM Marquis von Beauvau		Haraucourt (Arco) Reiter Regiment	6 coys	3,400
Bavarian Cavalry Regiments	GWM Marquis von Beauvau		Beauvau Reiter Regiment	6 coys	3,400
Bavarian Cavalry Regiments	GWM Marquis von Beauvau		Red Dragoon Half-Regiment	4 coys	3,400
Bavarian Cavalry Regiments	GWM von Munster		Bartls (Munster) Reiter Regiment	6 coys	3,400
Bavarian Cavalry Regiments	GWM von Munster		Schutz (Schuss) Reiter Regiment	6 coys	3,400
Bavarian Cavalry Regiments	GWM von Munster		Blue Dragoon Half-Regiment	4 coys	3,400
Artillery			26 regimental pieces, 20 field pieces & 2 mortars		287 men & 1,022 horses

Imperial units attached to Bavarians
Type	Brigade	Commander	Unit	Strength
Imperial Infantry Regiments (attached to Bavarians)			Beck (Imperial) Infantry Regiment	1 bn
Imperial Infantry Regiments (attached to Bavarians)			Steindorf (Salzburg) Infantry Regiment	
Imperial Infantry Regiments (attached to Bavarians)			Rummel (Bavarian Circle) Infantry Battalion	
Imperial Infantry Regiments (attached to Bavarians)			Rodern (Pfalz-Neuburg) Infantry Battalion	

==== Saxons ====
General Staff:

- Generalfeldmarschall Freiherr von der Goltz
- Generalfeldmarschall-Leutnant von Flemming
  - Generalwachtmeister von Neitschütz
  - Generalwachtmeister Duke Christian von Sachsen-Weißenfels
  - Generalwachtmeister von Trauttmannsdorff

Total - 10,454

Saxon Auxiliary Corps
Type	Commander	Unit	Strength
Saxon Infantry Regiments (each regiment had 2 bns, each of 2 coys)	Oberstleutnant von Schönfeld	Leib Infantry Regiment	7,073
Saxon Infantry Regiments (each regiment had 2 bns, each of 2 coys)	Oberstleutnant von Kleist	Infantry Regiment of Feldmarschall von der Golz	7,073
Saxon Infantry Regiments (each regiment had 2 bns, each of 2 coys)	Oberstleutnant von Carlowitz	Infantry Regiment of Generalwachtmeister von Sachsen-Weißenfels	7,073
Saxon Infantry Regiments (each regiment had 2 bns, each of 2 coys)	Oberstleutnant von Flemming	Infantry Regiment of Feldmarschall-Lieutenant von Flemming	7,073
Saxon Infantry Regiments (each regiment had 2 bns, each of 2 coys)	Oberst von Kuffer	Infantry Regiment of Oberst von Kuffer	7,073
Saxon Infantry Regiments (each regiment had 2 bns, each of 2 coys)	Oberst von Löben	Infantry Regiment of Oberst von Löben	7,073
Grenadiers	Hauptmann von Bose	One Grenadier company	7,073
Saxon Cavalry Regiments (each regiment had 3 squadrons, each of 2 coys)	Generalwachtmeister von Neitschütz	Leibgarde-trabanten zu Ross (Elector's personal horse mounted body guard)	3,194
Saxon Cavalry Regiments (each regiment had 3 squadrons, each of 2 coys)	Oberstleutnant von Haugwitz	Leib Reiter Regiment	3,194
Saxon Cavalry Regiments (each regiment had 3 squadrons, each of 2 coys)	Oberstleutnant Freiherr von Engelmünster	Plotho Reiter Regiment	3,194
Saxon Cavalry Regiments (each regiment had 3 squadrons, each of 2 coys)	Oberstleutnant de Bronne (from Lorraine)	Goltz Reiter Regiment	3,194
Saxon Cavalry Regiments (each regiment had 3 squadrons, each of 2 coys)	Oberstleutnant von Wolframsdorff	Trautmannsdorff Reiter Regiment	3,194
Saxon Cavalry Regiments (each regiment had 3 squadrons, each of 2 coys)	Oberstleutnant von Mintwiz	Generalwachtmeister Graf Reuss' Dragoon Regiment	3,194
Artillery	Oberzeughauptmann von Borau	16 cannons (various calibers) + 2 petards	187 men & 351 horses

==== Reich Troops ====
Total:

- 7,000 foot
- 2,500 horse

Reich troops
Type	Commander	Unit	Strength
Franconian Circle Infantry Regiments	Johann Wilhelm Köth von Wanscheid	Koth Infantry Regiment	7,000
Franconian Circle Infantry Regiments	Philipp Heinrich von Andlau	Andlau Infantry Regiment	7,000
Swabian Circle Infantry Regiments	Charles Gustav of Baden-Durlach	Durlach Infantry Regiment	7,000
Swabian Circle Infantry Regiments		Öttingen Infantry Regiment	7,000
Franconian Circle Cavalry Regiments	Christian Ernst, Margrave of Brandenburg-Bayreuth	Cuirassier Regiment	2,500
Franconian Circle Cavalry Regiments	Christoph Wilhelm von Aufseß	Herdesdorff (Würzburg) Dragoon Regiment	2,500
Swabian Circle Cavalry Regiments		Gronsfeld Cuirassier Regiment	2,500
Swabian Circle Cavalry Regiments		Hohnstett Dragoon Regiment	2,500
Artillery			12 guns

==== Polish ====
(A banner is a force of 200 men)

Total:

- estimated at 10,200 foot (20 regiments in 8 brigades)
- 14,000 horse

Polish troops
Type	Brigades	Commander	Unit	Divided into
Polish Royal Infantry Total: 200 foot			Janissaries Infantry Company	
Polish Royal Infantry Total: 200 foot			Hayduks Infantry Company	
Polish Royal Cavalry Total: 1,000 horse			Royal Guards (Drabant Reiter)	
Polish Royal Cavalry Total: 1,000 horse			King's Hussars	2 banners
Polish Royal Cavalry Total: 1,000 horse			King's Armored Horse	2 banners
Polish Royal Cavalry Total: 1,000 horse			King's Cossacks	1 banner
Right flank Polish Infantry Regiments	King's Own Brigade		King's Infantry Regiment	
Right flank Polish Infantry Regiments	King's Own Brigade		Crown Prince Jacob's Infantry Regiment	
Right flank Polish Infantry Regiments	Stanisław Morsztyn's Brigade		S. Morsztyn Infantry Regiment	
Right flank Polish Infantry Regiments	Stanisław Morsztyn's Brigade		Truchsess von Wiski Infantry Regiment	
Right flank Polish Infantry Regiments	F.Kacki's Brigade		F.Kacki Infantry Regiment	
Right flank Polish Infantry Regiments	F.Kacki's Brigade		Wacław Leszczyński Infantry Regiment	
Right flank Polish Infantry Regiments	F.Greben's Brigade		Fryderyk Greben Infantry Regiment	
Right flank Polish Infantry Regiments	F.Greben's Brigade		Grand Hetman Stanisław Jabłonowski Infantry Regiment	
Right flank Polish Infantry Regiments	F.Greben's Brigade		Crown Referendary Jan Krasiński Infantry Regiment	
Left flank Polish Infantry Regiments	Buttler's Brigade		Buttler Infantry Regiment	
Left flank Polish Infantry Regiments	Buttler's Brigade		M.Kacki Infantry Regiment (Detached to guard guns)	
Left flank Polish Infantry Regiments	Danemark's Brigade		Danemark Infantry Regiment	
Left flank Polish Infantry Regiments	Danemark's Brigade		Stanisław Potocki Infantry Regiment	
Left flank Polish Infantry Regiments	Danemark's Brigade		Prince Jerzy Lubomirski Infantry Regiment	
Left flank Polish Infantry Regiments	Danemark's Brigade		Count de Maligny Infantry Regiment	
Left flank Polish Infantry Regiments	T.Zamoyski's Brigade		T.Zamoyski Infantry Regiment	
Left flank Polish Infantry Regiments	T.Zamoyski's Brigade		Grinski Infantry Regiment	
Left flank Polish Infantry Regiments	Kreuzer's Brigade		Wielopolski Infantry Regiment	
Left flank Polish Infantry Regiments	Kreuzer's Brigade		Crown Field Hetman Sieniawski Infantry Regiment	
Left flank Polish Infantry Regiments	Kreuzer's Brigade		W. Denhoff Infantry Regiment	
Cavalry			36 armoured horse & hussar banners including: The King's; Prince Jacob's; Prince Alexander's; Grand Marshal Lubomirski's; and Potocki's	
Artillery				28 guns

== See also ==
- Structure of the Royal Polish Army in the Siege of Vienna (1683)

== Bibliography ==
- Millar, Simon (2008). Vienna 1683: Christian Europe repels the Ottomans. Osprey Publishing. ISBN 978-184603-231-8.
- Nafziger, George (1998). "Relief of Vienna 13 September 1683" (PDF). Combined Arms Research Library Digital Library. Archived from the original (PDF) on 2016-12-23.
- Schuster, O.; Francke, F.U. (1885). Geschichte der Sächsischen Armee von deren Errichtung bis auf die neueste Zeit. Vol. 1.
- Staudinger (1885). Geschichte der kurbayerischen Heers unter Kurfurst Max II. Vol. 1. München, J. Lindauer.
- Streffleur, V. (1863). "Belagerung von Wien im Jahre 1683". Österreichischen Militärischen Zeitschrift. 2. Vienna.
- Twardowski, Bolesław (1883). Szyk Bojowy Wojsk Polskich i sprzymierzonych dnia 12 Września 1683 r. (in Polish). Poznań: Księgarni Katolickiej.
