= Trush =

Trush may refer to:

- Trush, Albania, a settlement in Shkodër County, northern Albania
- Trush Street, a street in Ivano-Frankivsk, western Ukraine
- Ivan Trush (1869–1941), Ukrainian impressionist painter
- Dmitri Trush (born 1973), Olympic gymnast
- Volodymyr Trush (born 1980), Ukrainian politician

== See also ==
- Thrush (disambiguation)
