= Thrush =

Thrush may refer to:

== Birds ==
- Thrush (bird), any of the birds in the family Turdidae
  - List of thrush species
- Antthrushes, the Formicariidae family of birds
- Dohrn's warbler, or Dohrn's thrush-babbler, a species Sylvia dohrni in the family Timalidae
- Laughingthrushes, birds in the family Leiothrichidae
- Palm thrush, birds in the genus Cichladusa in the family Muscapidae
- Quail-thrush, birds in the genus Cinclosoma in the family Cinclosomatidae
- Rock thrush, birds in the genus Monticola in the family Muscapidae
- Rosy thrush-tanager, a species Rhodinocichla rosea in the family Thraupidae
- Shrikethrush, birds in the genus Colluricinclain in the family Colluricinclidae
- Spotted thrush-babbler, species Illadopsis turdina in the family Timaliidae
- Thrush nightingale, species Luscinia luscinia in the family Muscicapidae
- Thrush-like antpitta, species Myrmothera campanisona in the family Grallariidae
- Thrush-like schiffornis, a species complex
- Thrush-like woodcreeper or plain-winged woodcreeper, species Dendrocincla turdina in the family Furnariidae
- Thrush-like wren, species Campylorhynchus turdinus in the family Troglodytidae

== Diseases ==
- Candidiasis, a fungal (yeast) infection, commonly known as thrush
  - oral candidiasis, an oral yeast infection, commonly known as oral thrush
- Thrush (horse), a bacterial infection of the sole of a horse's hoof

== People ==
- Brian Thrush (1928–2023), British physical chemist
- Jeremy Thrush (born 1985), New Zealand rugby player
- Peter Dengate Thrush (born 1956), New Zealand barrister

== Transportation ==
- Ayres Thrush, an agricultural aircraft
- Blackburne Thrush, an early engine for light aircraft
- Curtiss Thrush, an early single-engined airliner
- Thrush, a brand of Tenneco, an American automotive components manufacturer
- Thrush Aircraft, an American aircraft manufacturer
- HMS Thrush, three ships of the British Royal Navy
- USS Thrush, two ships of the United States Navy

== Other uses ==
- THRUSH, a fictional organization in the TV series The Man from U.N.C.L.E.
- Thrush (racehorse), a Thoroughbred racehorse

== See also ==
- Drozd ('Thrush'), a Soviet tank defence system
