= Trel =

Trel may refer to:

- Fat Trel (born 1990), American rapper
- Trel., taxonomic author abbreviation of William Trelease (1857–1945), American botanist and entomologist
- Polish term for an area in the forest where felled timber is located, from which the surname Trela is derived

== See also ==
- La-Trel, abstract strategy board game designed by Richard Morgan
- Trelly, former commune in the Manche department in Normandy in north-western France
- Trell, a given name
