= Strachenykh Street =

Street in Ivano-Frankivsk, Ukraine

Street of Strachenykh
- Native name: Вулиця Страчених (Ukrainian)
- Former name: Tobilevych Street
- Length: 100 m (330 ft)
- Addresses: 7 Tempel; 7A "Pid Templem"
- Location: Central Ivano-Frankivsk, Ukraine
- north-west end: Market Square
- Major junctions: Armenian Street
- south-east end: Lesya Ukrainka Street; Mickiewicz Square

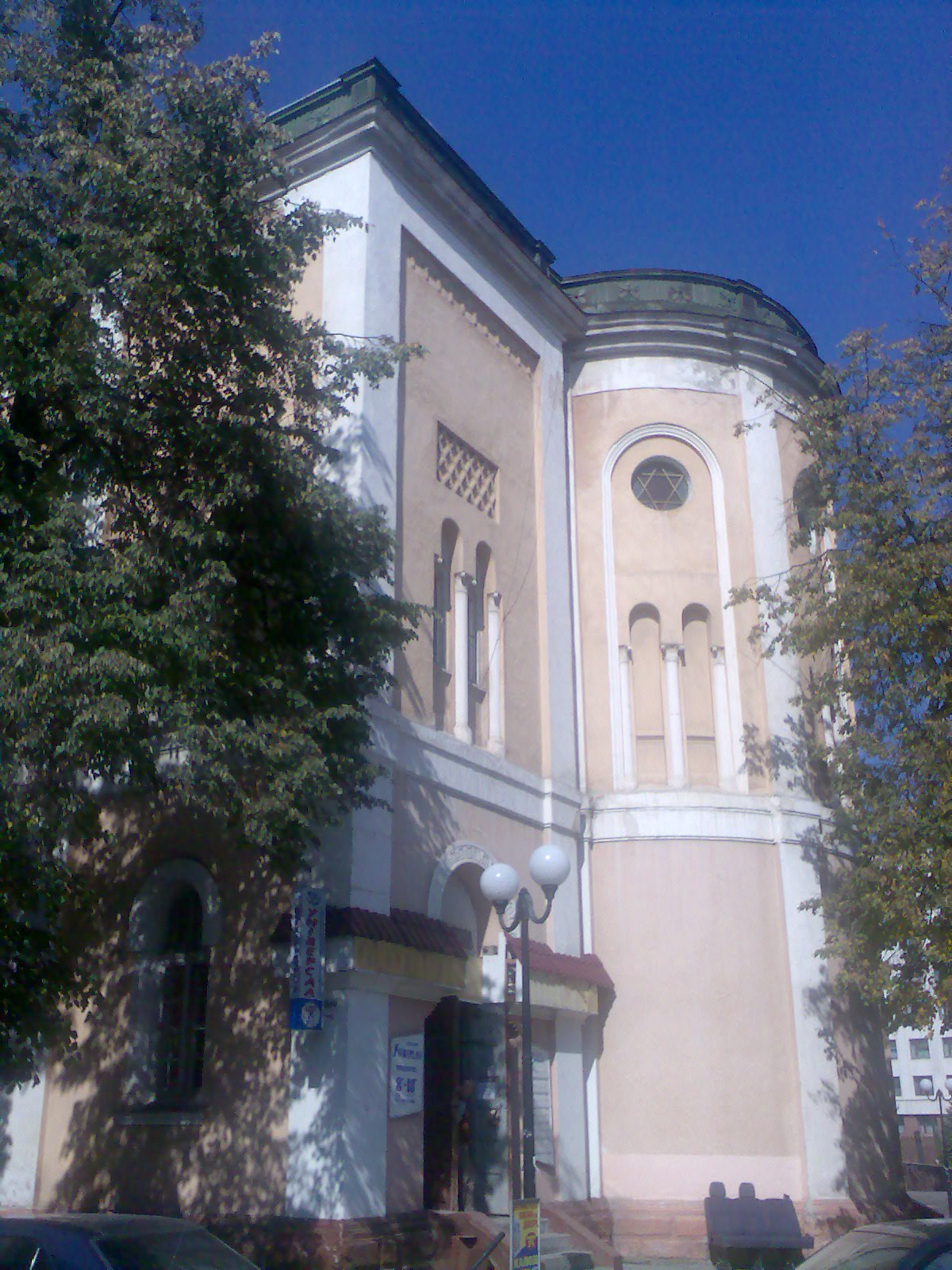
The synagogue "Tempel", today

Street of Strachenykh (Ukrainian: Вулиця Страчених) is a street located in the Ivano-Frankivsk old town between old town hall (Ratusha) and new city administration building Bily Dim. It is one of several small streets that lead to the city's rathaus.

During the Soviet times the street carried the name of Tobilevych after the Ukrainian play writer Ivan Tobilevych better known as Ivan Karpenko-Karyi. Since 1992 it was renamed into street of Stratchenykh (literally - street of Executed) to commemorate the 15 people who were executed by Gestapo in front of the city's synagogue in accusation of being the members of Organization of Ukrainian Nationalists. On November 17, 1943, 27 Ukrainians were executed there. A list of the names of executed people now is engraved at the foot of the sculpture.

The street runs between Market Square and Mickiewicz Square - Lesya Ukrainka Street. At Mickiewicz Square it also connects to Kurbas Street that runs around the mentioned square. Along the way the street of Strachenykh intersects Virmenska Street. At No.7 is located the city's synagogue "Tempel". Next to the synagogue there is a monument to the executed residents of the city and the three-star hotel "Pid Templem".

The street is relatively narrow, designated for a two way traffic. It has a row of trees on both sides separating sidewalk from a roadway.

== Architectural monuments ==
- Synagogue "Tempel"
- Monument to the executed
