= Dengate =

Dengate is a surname. Notable people with the surname include:

- John Dengate (1938–2013), Australian folk singer and songwriter
- Peter Dengate Thrush (born 1956), a.k.a. "PDT", New Zealand barrister specialising in Internet law
