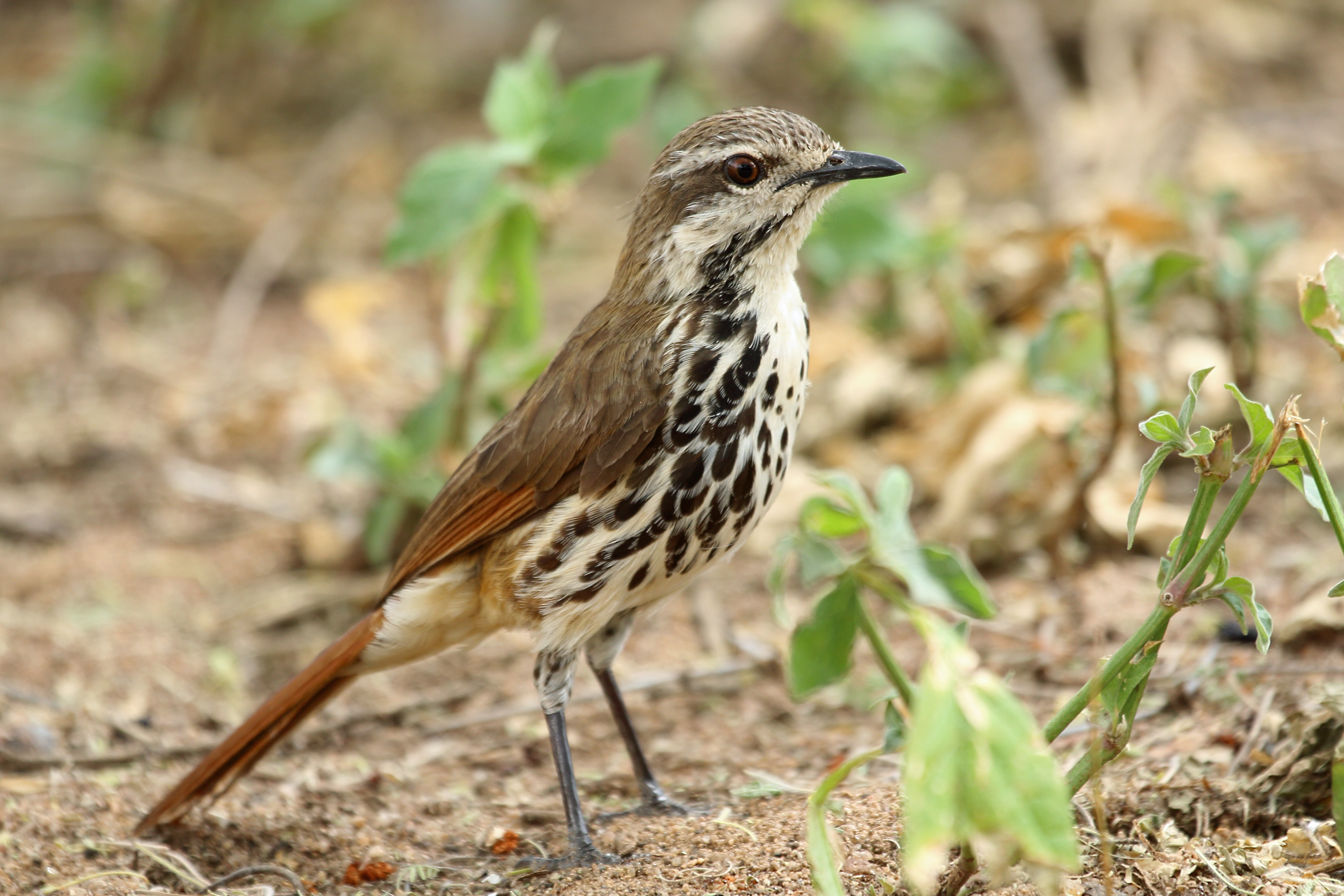
- Adult at Lake Manyara, Tanzania

Conservation status
- Least Concern (IUCN 3.1)

Scientific classification
- Kingdom: Animalia
- Phylum: Chordata
- Class: Aves
- Order: Passeriformes
- Family: Muscicapidae
- Genus: Cichladusa
- Species: C. guttata

Binomial name
- Cichladusa guttata (Heuglin, 1862)

Audio
- Song recorded in southwestern Kenya

= Spotted palm thrush =

Species of bird

The spotted palm thrush (Cichladusa guttata), also known as the spotted morning-thrush, is a species of bird in the Muscicapidae family. They are small birds mostly consisting of the colors brown, black, and cream. They can be found in eastern African countries such as Ethiopia, Kenya, Somalia, Sudan, Tanzania, and Uganda. Their natural habitats are subtropical or tropical dry forests, dry savanna, and subtropical or tropical moist shrubland. This bird is a forager that has a diet consisting of invertebrates. These birds create a variety of different vocal duets as a form of communication.

== Appearance ==
The spotted palm thrush measures around 16-17 centimeters (6.3-6.7 inches) long and weighs around 17-30 grams (<0.1 pounds). This bird features a warm brown color from crown to back and wings, with a dark brown eye stripe, and black-arrowed, creamy white underparts. The males and females are monomorphic, having little variance in their appearance regardless of sex.

== Habitat ==
The spotted palm thrush is located in most parts of Ethiopia, South Sudan, Uganda, Kenya, Somalia, and Tanzania. They can also be found in the easternmost parts of the Democratic Republic of the Congo, and the southernmost parts of Sudan. These birds commonly dwell in habitats along the dense undergrowth within savannas, woodland, dry watercourses, thickets, and scrub habitats.

== Diet ==
The spotted palm thrush has a diet consisting of invertebrates, such as small snails, and cordia fruits. At an early age, a spotted palm thrush will mostly eat bush-cricket nymphs, beetle larvae, lampyrinae larvae, and moth caterpillars. Spotted palm thrushes get their food by foraging on the ground, both single and in pairs, in human populated areas near game-park lodges and gardens.

== Vocal behavior ==
The spotted palm thrush creates different sounds and imitations for different reasons of contact. Two of these main vocal performances include course singing and repetitive singing. Spotted palm thrushes will perform course singing by themselves. Once they are paired with a bird of the opposite sex, they engage in repetitive singing. The sex of the bird can be distinguished based on their duet contributions; duets are commonly initiated by males, and females sing during the silent intervals between male notes. Normally, these duets last around 8 to 20 seconds, and the duration and volume of the duet could change based on the birds' levels of excitement. To indicate their excitement before and after duets, spotted palm thrushes will raise their body, pointing their head and bill upward, and show their spotted throat.
