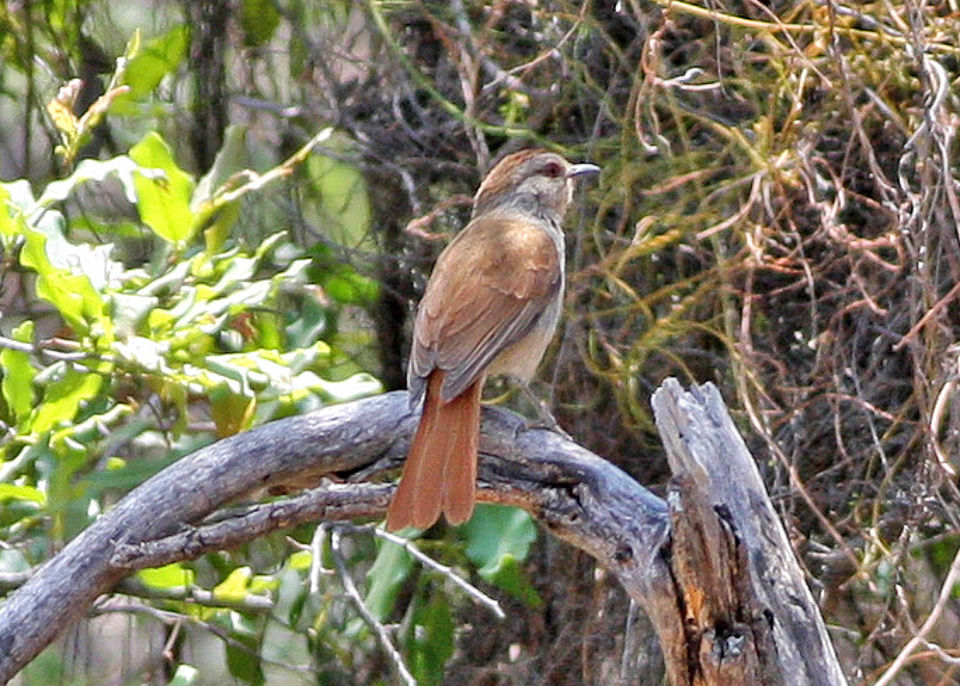

Conservation status
- Least Concern (IUCN 3.1)

Scientific classification
- Kingdom: Animalia
- Phylum: Chordata
- Class: Aves
- Order: Passeriformes
- Family: Muscicapidae
- Genus: Cichladusa
- Species: C. ruficauda

Binomial name
- Cichladusa ruficauda (Hartlaub, 1857)

Synonyms
- Bradyornis ruficauda

= Rufous-tailed palm thrush =

Species of bird

The rufous-tailed palm thrush (Cichladusa ruficauda) is a species of bird in the family Muscicapidae.

== Taxonomy ==
The rufous-tailed palm thrush was described as Bradyornis ruficauda by Hartlaub in 1857. The species is monotypic.

== Distribution and habitat ==
This species is found in Angola, Central African Republic, Republic of the Congo, Democratic Republic of the Congo, Equatorial Guinea, Gabon, and Namibia. The size of its range is estimated at 1,700,000 km^{2} (660,000 sq mi). Its habitat is palms, dry forests and secondary forests in riparian and coastal areas, at elevations of up to 1,200 m (3,900 ft). It also occurs in banana plantations and gardens.

== Description ==
Its length is 17–18 cm (6.7–7.1 in), and its weight is 22–37 g (0.78–1.31 oz). The sexes are alike. The head and nape are bright rufous-brown. The back, scapulars and the median and greater coverts are also rufous-brown but are slightly paler. The flight feathers are dark brown, with rufous or rufous-brown edges, and the underwing coverts are pale buffish-brown. The rump and tail are rufous-brown or chestnut. The face and neck-sides are mostly pale grey, with the lores being darker. The chin, throat and upper breast are yellowish buff. The breast and flanks are pale grey, and the centre of the belly is pale buff. The colour of the eyes ranges from brown to red. The beak is black, and the legs can be pale brown, pale purple or bluish grey. The juvenile bird has dark streaks on its crown and nape and dark bars on its back. Its underparts are mostly greyish, with dark or dusky mottles.

== Behaviour ==
The rufous-tailed palm thrush is shy, usually found in pairs or small groups. It gives the call churr when alarmed. Its song, usually given at dawn or dusk, is a series of loud and melodious whistles, mixed with babbling and chattering. Pairs of birds sometimes duet. It forages on the ground, mainly feeding on adults and larvae of beetles, spiders, and fruits. Breeding has been recorded from August to April. The species is monogamous. The nest is built at the base of a palm leaf, in a crevice in a tree trunk, and sometimes in other positions. It is a deep, thick cup, made of mud and lined with grass and plant fibres. There are one to four eggs in a clutch. The eggs are pale greenish, with faint freckles. It is not migratory.

== Status ==
The population size of this species is not known. Because it has a large range, appears to have a stable population trend, and does not appear to have substantial threats, the IUCN Red List has assessed the species as least concern.
