= Trell =

Trell is a given name. Notable people with the name include:

- Trell Hooper (born 1961), American football player
- Trell Kimmons (born 1985), American sprinter

== See also ==
- Trel (disambiguation)
