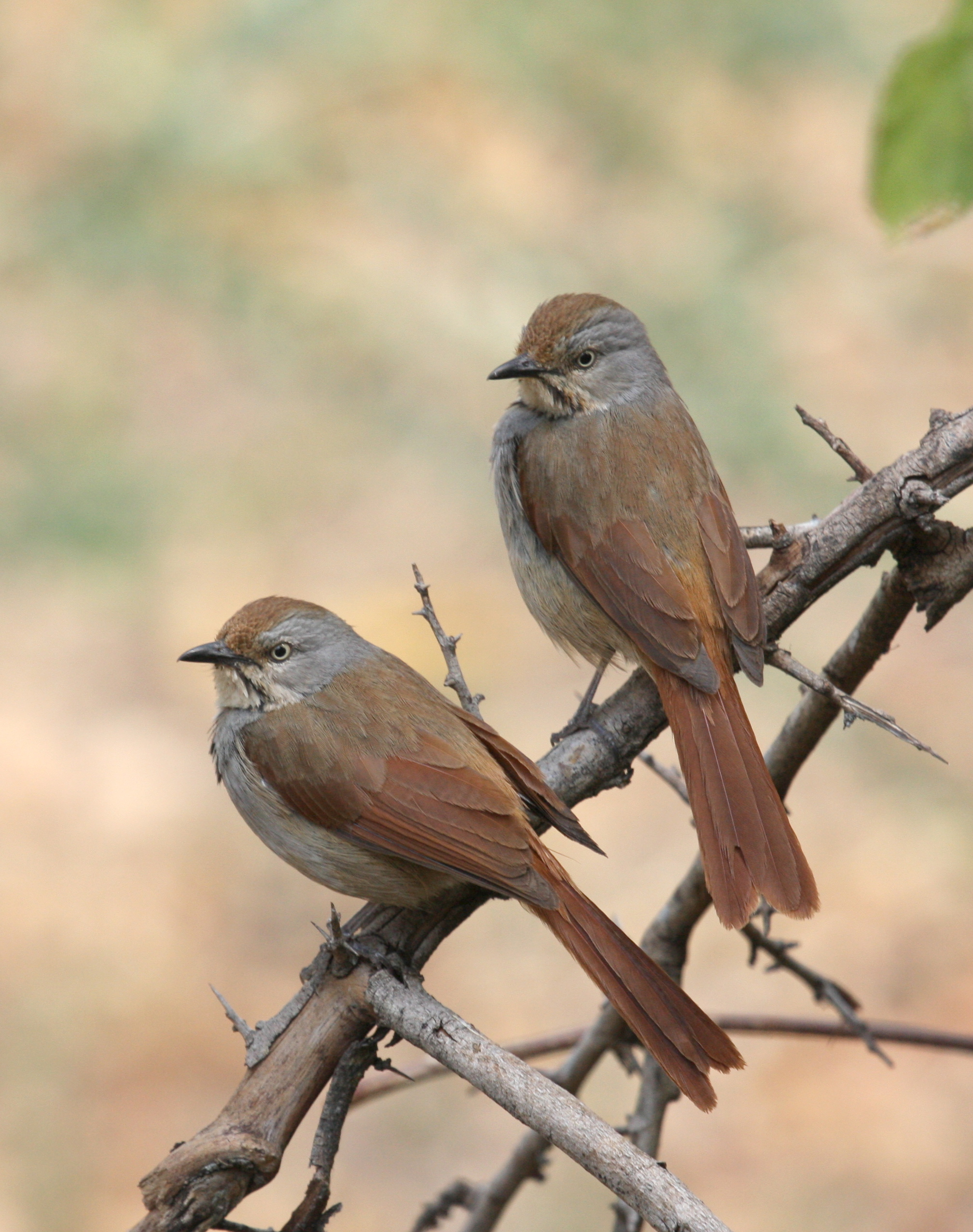
- Two in Ruaha National Park, Tanzania

Conservation status
- Least Concern (IUCN 3.1)

Scientific classification
- Kingdom: Animalia
- Phylum: Chordata
- Class: Aves
- Order: Passeriformes
- Family: Muscicapidae
- Genus: Cichladusa
- Species: C. arquata

Binomial name
- Cichladusa arquata Peters, 1863

= Collared palm thrush =

Species of bird

The collared palm thrush (Cichladusa arquata) is a species of bird in the family Muscicapidae. It is found in Botswana, Burundi, Democratic Republic of the Congo, Kenya, Malawi, Mozambique, Rwanda, Tanzania, Uganda, Zambia, and Zimbabwe. Its natural habitats are dry savannah and subtropical or tropical moist shrubland.

The Collared palm thrush is an odd and distinctive bird, easily recognized by its unique features. With a gray head, pale eye, and striking rufous back, it stands out among its feathered counterparts. One of its most defining characteristics is the black mark outlining its throat. This bird prefers to inhabit thickets within palm savannas, where its beautiful song fills the air. Its distinctive song consists of a series of airy, wailing notes, accompanied by chattering and rasping calls. While it may bear some resemblance to the Spotted Morning-Thrush, the Collared thrush stands apart with its pale eye, bright rufous back, and absence of spotting below. Although it shares similarities with nightingales and scrub-robins, the black throat markings serve as a clear distinguishing feature.
