= Trela =

Trela is a surname of Polish origin which derives from trel – an area in the forest where felled timber is located or trill. Notable people with the name include:

- Dariusz Trela (born 1989), Polish soccer player
- Elżbieta Trela-Mazur (born 1947), Polish historian
- Jerzy Trela (1942–2022), Polish actor
- Stanisław Trela (1892–1950), Polish architect
- Jakub Trela (born 2017), child
