= USS Thrush =

USS Thrush may refer to the following ships of the United States Navy:

- USS Thrush (AM-18), laid down on 27 May 1918 at Wilmington, Delaware.
- USS Thrush (MSC-204), laid down as AMS-204 on 7 May 1954 at Tampa, Florida.
