= Market Square, Ivano-Frankivsk =

Market square in Ivano-Frankivsk, Ukraine

Coordinates: 48°55′21″N 24°42′36″E

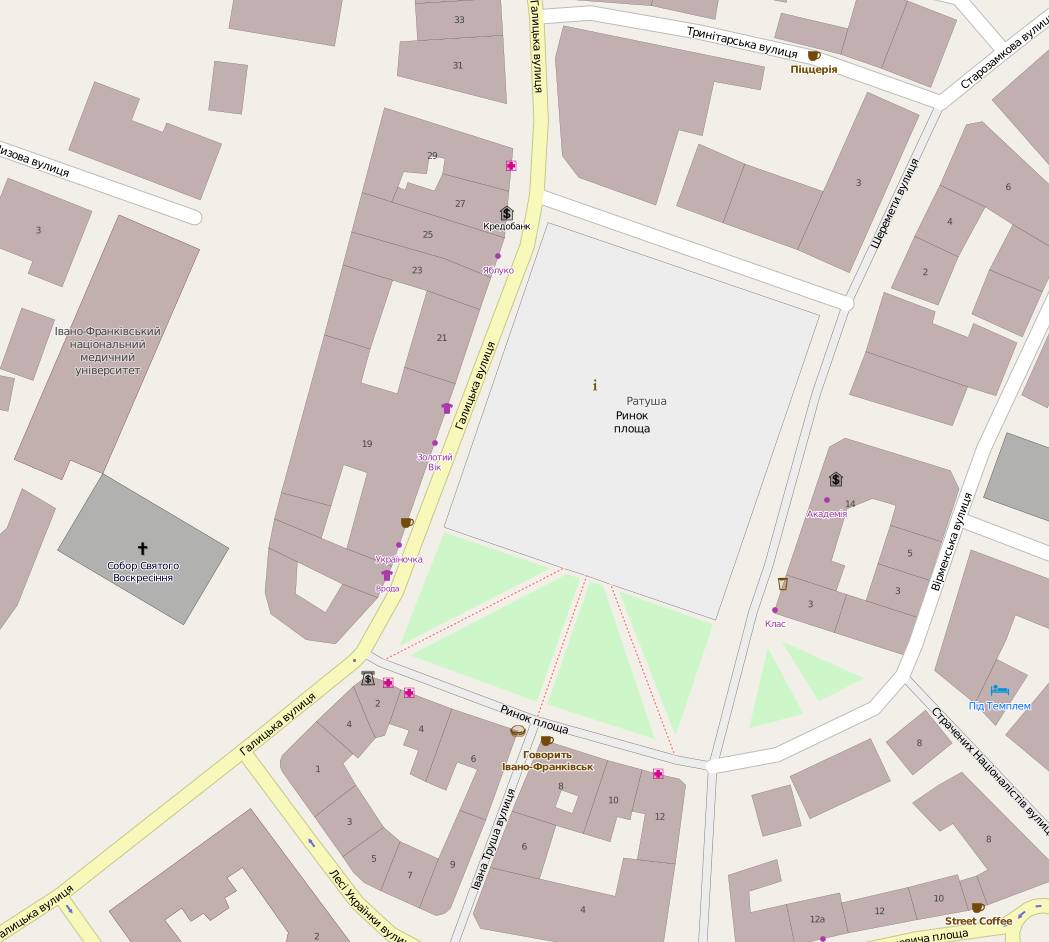
Market Square (Ploshcha Rynok).

Market Square in Ivano-Frankivsk, also known as Ploshcha Rynok (Ukrainian: Площа Ринок), is historically the central square of the city. It is the oldest square and traces its history to the city's establishment. The main feature of the square is the former city hall, Ratusha, which today serves as the building of the Museum of regional studies.

== Composition ==
The square is rectangular in shape with one major street running through its western side, Halych Street. Halych Street is one of the major transportation arteries of the city and is part of the H 09 (National Route 9). On the east edge stretches the Street of Sheremety which starts at Shpytalna Street (just northeast of the square) and connects the Market Square with Mickewicz Square. The southern edge was part of the September 17th Street, but after the fall of the Soviet Union the street was "annexed" to the Market Square. The northern row of buildings was the only one that never changed its owner and stayed as part of the square even through the Soviet times. In the middle of the square is located Ratusha, the former city's town hall. Just south of the Ratusha is located a fountain in the form of an egg. The square is surrounded by rows of some commercial and residential houses of two-three stories high.

On the western side a single row of buildings splits the Market Square from Sheptytsky Square named after Andriy Sheptytsky. To the south another row of building separates the square from picturesque Mickiewicz Square. At the south-western corner is located the Saint Resurrection Cathedral (former temple of Jesuits). Couple of hundred meters to the north of the square is located the city's market and the Central Department Store, known as TsUM. To the north-east are located the Potocki Palace (Military Hospital) and the Municipal/Regional Administration Building (Bilyi Dim). Behind the eastern row of buildings is located the Armenian Church, also known as the Blue Church, as well as the Ivano-Frankivsk Regional Philharmony (Orchestra Hall).

In 2012, by decision of the city council, Market Square in Ivano-Frankivsk became a pedestrian zone. Motorists were prohibited from free passage through the central adjacent streets and since then are forced to pay a toll to pass through.

== Houses ==
=== Eastern side ===
- Number 2. Sherematy Street. A two-story house is located at the northeast corner of the square facing west. It is part of a five-buildings row. The first floor is rented by various businesses, second floor - residential.
- Number 2a. Sherematy Street. A three-and-half-story building that is located right next to the previous one. It is known as the Trade Center "Maidan".

=== Southern side ===
- Number 8.

=== Western side ===
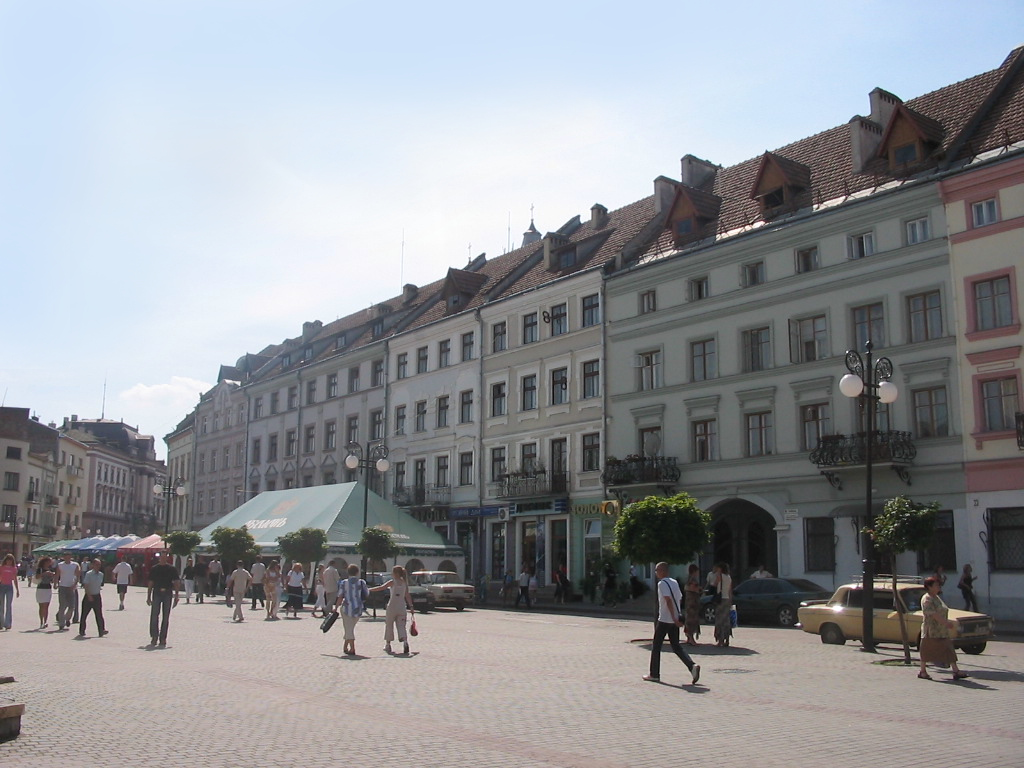
The western side of the square - the Halych Street buildings, looking southwest. Similar buildings surround the rest of the Market Square.

- Number 29. Halych Street.

=== Center ===
- Number 4a. Ratusha.

== Minor Streets ==
The southern row of buildings is interrupted by the Trush Street which also connects the Market Square with Mickewicz Square near the Medical University and Lesya Ukrainka Street. At the southeastern corner of Rynok Square is located a small park, beyond which stretches another small street of Strachenykh. That streets runs towards the Oblast Philarmony located at eastern corner of the Mickewicz Square. The eastern row of buildings at the Market Square "cuts" the Melnychuk Street that starting from the square stretches straight towards the Hrushevsky Street and running past the Oblast/City administration building, the Bily Dim (White House).
