= Trush Street =

Street in central Ivano-Frankivsk, Ukraine

Ivan Trush Street
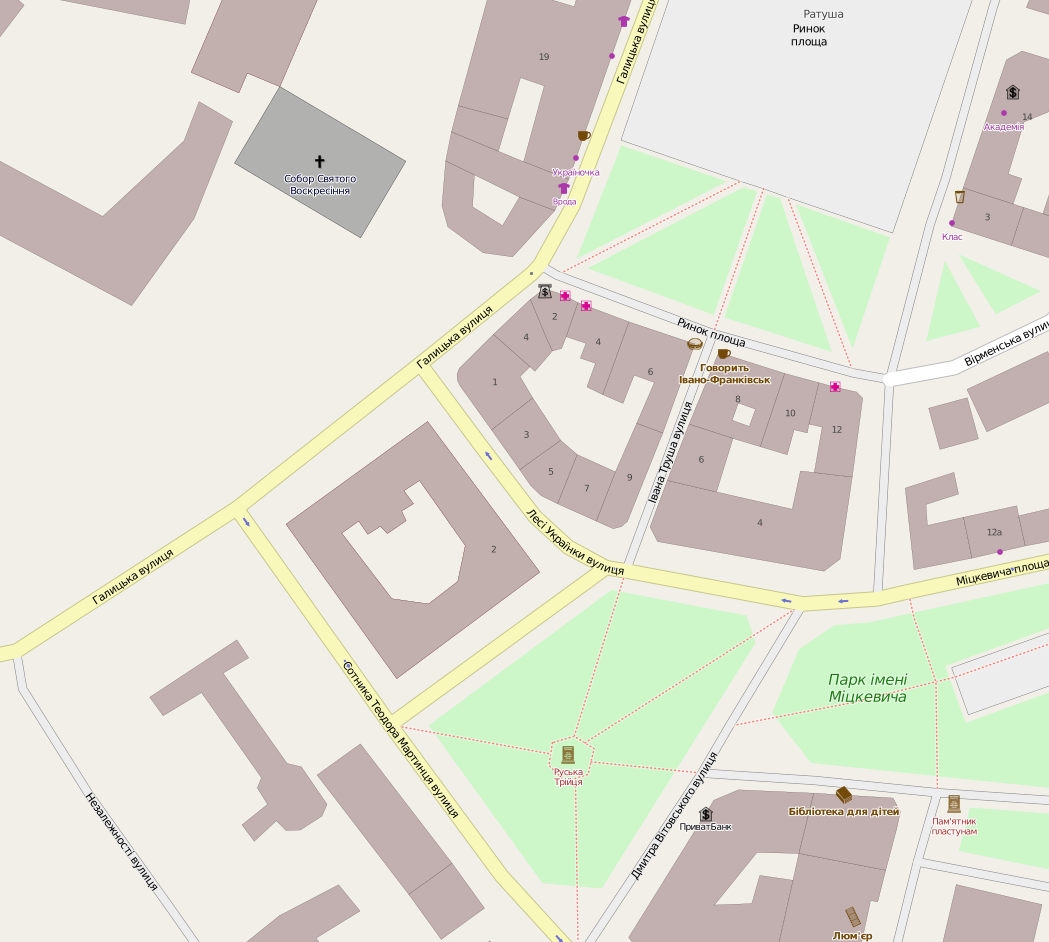
- Native name: Вулиця Труша (Ukrainian)
- Length: 65 m (213 ft)
- Location: Central Ivano-Frankivsk, Ukraine
- north end: Market Square
- south end: Lesya Ukrainka Street; Mickiewicz Square

Ivan Trush Street (Ukrainian: Вулиця Труша) is a street located in the Ivano-Frankivsk old town. It connects Market Square with Mickiewicz Square.

The street is short and very narrow. It is commemorated to the Ukrainian impressionist painter Ivan Trush. At its southern end the street comes up onto the Mickiewicz Square and Lesya Ukrainka Street where is located the city's medical university. At one point in time the building served as the Administration building of the Stanislawow voivodeship 1921 to 1935.
