= USS Thrush (MSC-204) =

Minesweeper of the United States Navy

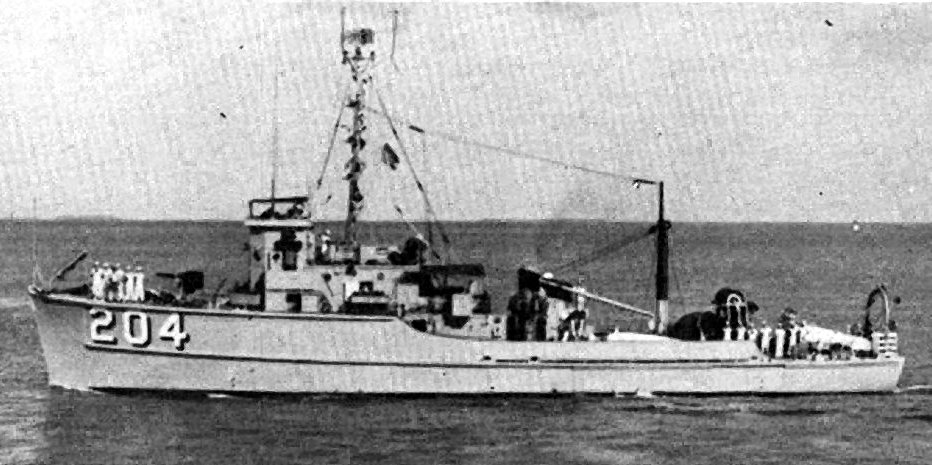
- USS Thrush (MSC-204), steaming out of Key West, Florida

History

United States
- Name: Thrush
- Namesake: Thrush
- Builder: Tampa Marine Company, Tampa, Florida
- Laid down: 7 May 1954
- Launched: 5 January 1955
- Commissioned: 8 November 1955
- Decommissioned: 1 July 1975
- Reclassified: Coastal Minesweeper, 7 February 1955
- Stricken: 1 August 1977
- Home port: 1956: Yorktown, Virginia; 1957: Key West, Florida; 1959: Coco Solo, Panama; 1962: Miami, Florida; 1971: Port Everglades, Florida
- Identification: Hull symbol: AMS-204; Hull symbol: MSC-204
- Fate: Virginia Institute of Marine Science, Gloucester Point, Virginia

United States
- Name: Virginia Sea
- Operator: VIMS
- Acquired: 1 July 1975
- Refit: Ocean Research Vessel
- Fate: Scrapped 1 August 1982

General characteristics
- Class & type: Bluebird-class minesweeper
- Displacement: 320 long tons (330 t)
- Length: 144 ft (44 m)
- Beam: 28 ft (8.5 m)
- Draft: 9 ft 4 in (2.84 m)
- Installed power: 2 × General Motors 880 horsepower (660 kW) 8-268A diesel engines; 1,760 horsepower (1,310 kW)
- Propulsion: Snow and Knobstedt single reduction gear; 2 × screws
- Speed: 13 kn (24 km/h; 15 mph)
- Complement: 39
- Armament: 2 × 20 mm (0.8 in) Oerlikon cannons anti-aircraft (AA) mounts

USS Thrush (MSC-204) was a Bluebird-class minesweeper in the service of the United States Navy from 1955 to 1975.

== Construction ==
The second Thrush was laid down 7 May 1954, by Tampa Marine Company, Tampa, Florida; launched on 5 January 1955, as AMS-204; sponsored by Mrs. Edgar S. Russell; reclassified as MSC-204, on 7 February 1955; and commissioned on 8 November 1955.

== Assignments ==
Soon after her commissioning in November 1955, Thrush arrived in Chesapeake Bay to conduct a successful shakedown cruise. In 1956, she was assigned to the Yorktown, Virginia, Mine Warfare School, followed in August by assignment to Norfolk, Virginia, to participate in Operation Hideaway. In 1957, Thrush moved to her new homeport in Key West, Florida, where she tested and evaluated new mine warfare equipment for the 6th Naval District's Mine Warfare Evaluation Detachment.

While serving as a Naval Reservist, then-Lieutenant, later Rear Admiral LeRoy Collins Jr. was Thrush's commanding officer from 1968 to 1969.

In 1974, she assisted in expanding the Osborne Artificial Reef.

== Notes ==
Citations

== Bibliography ==
Online resources

- "Thrush II (MSC-204)". Dictionary of American Naval Fighting Ships. Naval History and Heritage Command. 29 September 2015. This article incorporates text from this source, which is in the public domain.
- "Thrush (MSC-204)". NavSource.
