= La-Trel =

La-Trel is an abstract strategy board game designed by Richard Morgan. It was nominated for the Spiel des Jahres award 1996. The game is played on a standard chessboard and combines elements from chess and draughts. It was released in three editions: a standard edition with plastic pieces, a Deluxe Wooden Edition with pieces made of wood and a Deluxe Metal Edition with metal pieces.

== Rules ==
Each player starts with a set of 16 (or 18 if the blocker pieces are used) pieces arranged on the far sides of the board. The goal of the game is to defeat all of the opponents attacker pieces. Attacker pieces defeat an opponent's piece by jumping over the opponent's piece. Moves can be combined into chain moves, defeating several pieces at once. Each piece has its own move rules. For example, the Trident moves any number of fields diagonally.
