= Stanisław Trela =

Polish architect (1892–1950)

Stanisław Trela (1892–1950) was a Polish architect best known for his designs of public utility buildings in interwar Ivano-Frankivsk (then Stanisławów, Second Polish Republic).

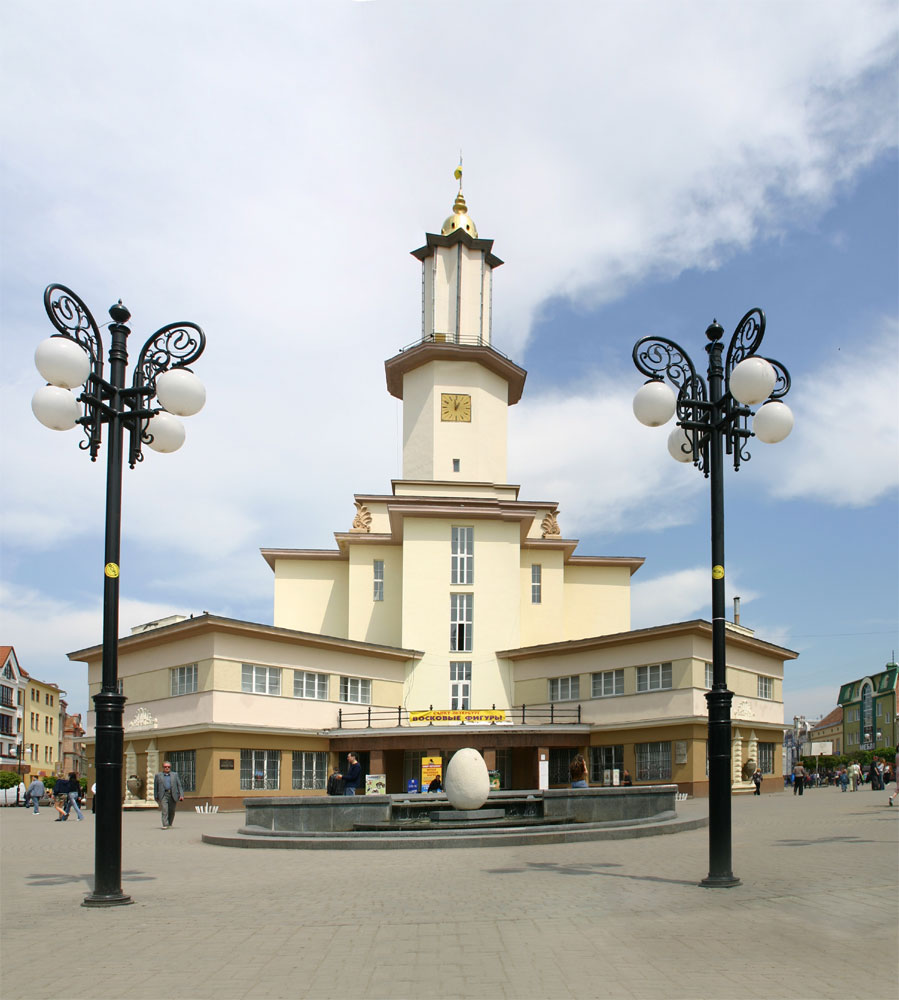
Ivano-Frankivsk Town Hall was inspired by expressionism and so called Kraków's School of Art Deco

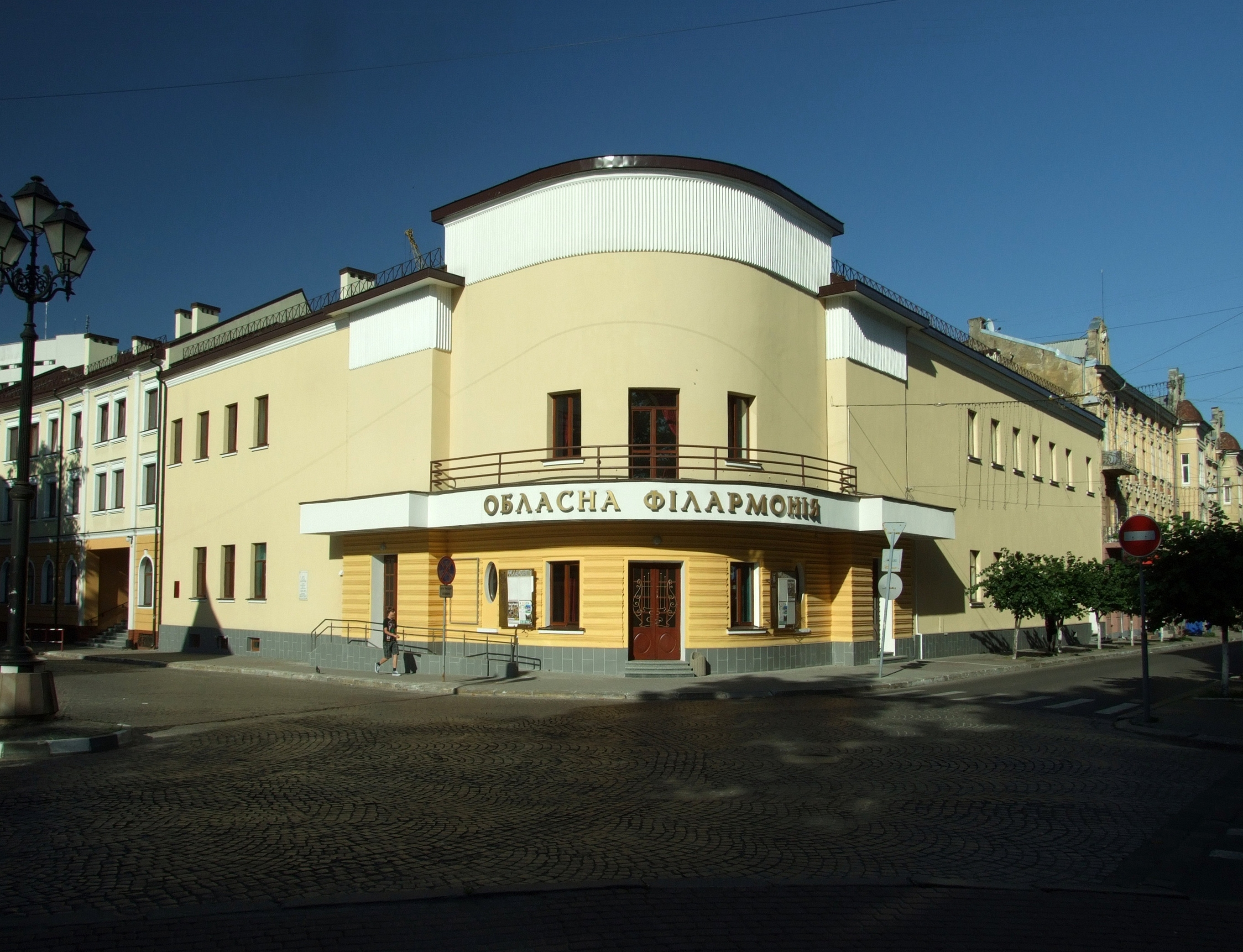
Ivano-Frankivsk Concert Hall

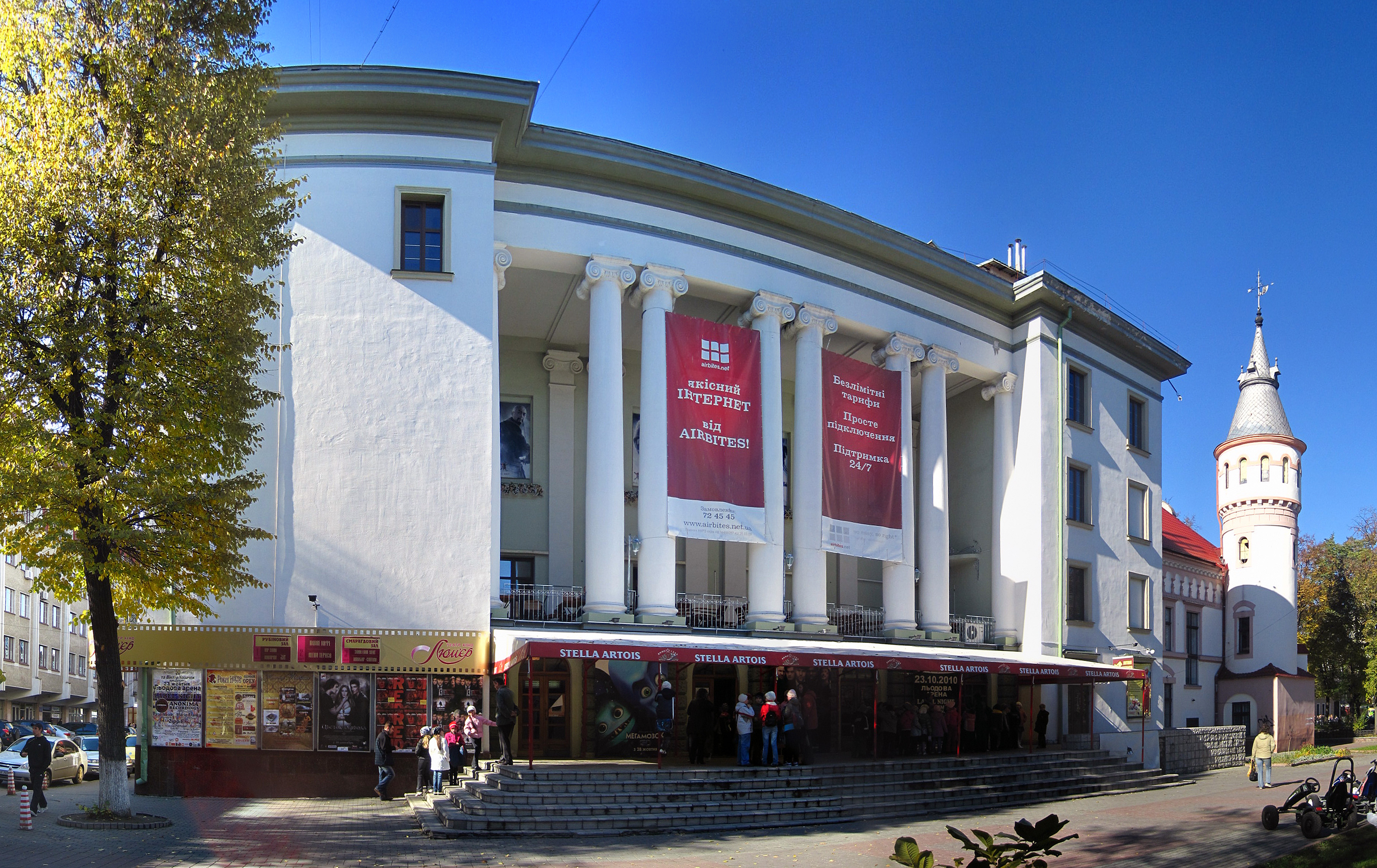
"Lumiere" cinema (former "Ton")

Trela was born on 19 April 1892 in Żurawiczki, Austria-Hungary. His father was a teacher. He finished his school education in Przemyśl and in 1913 started to study architecture at Lemberg Polytechnic. In 1918–1919, he served in the Polish Army. He was promoted to the rank of lieutenant. Trela received his degree in architecture in 1924, and a year later moved to Stanisławów where he worked as the city architect from 1928 to 1932. He also presided over the local Society of Independent Construction Managers and was a member of the Polish Polytechnical Society.

Trela studied under the noted architect Witold Minkiewicz. His architectural style blended modern and traditional elements. He frequently incorporated a simplified monumental classicism into his projects.

== Projects ==
His major works in Ivano-Frankivsk (Stanisławów) included:

- Town Hall
- Roman Catholic Church in the Górka district
- Stanisław Moniuszko Municipal Theater at Mickiewicz Square (now Ivano-Frankivsk Concert Hall, Les Kurbas Street)
- Expansion and reconstruction of the "Sokół" Gymnastic Society building (originally designed by Karol Zaremba in 1894–1905)
- The "Ton" cinema
- School complex on Matejki Street (now the city's hospital)
- Craftsmen's hall of residence on Sobieski Street
- Fire brigade building
- Restoration of the Armenian Church
