= Ratusha (Ivano-Frankivsk) =

Historic town hall

- Ратуша
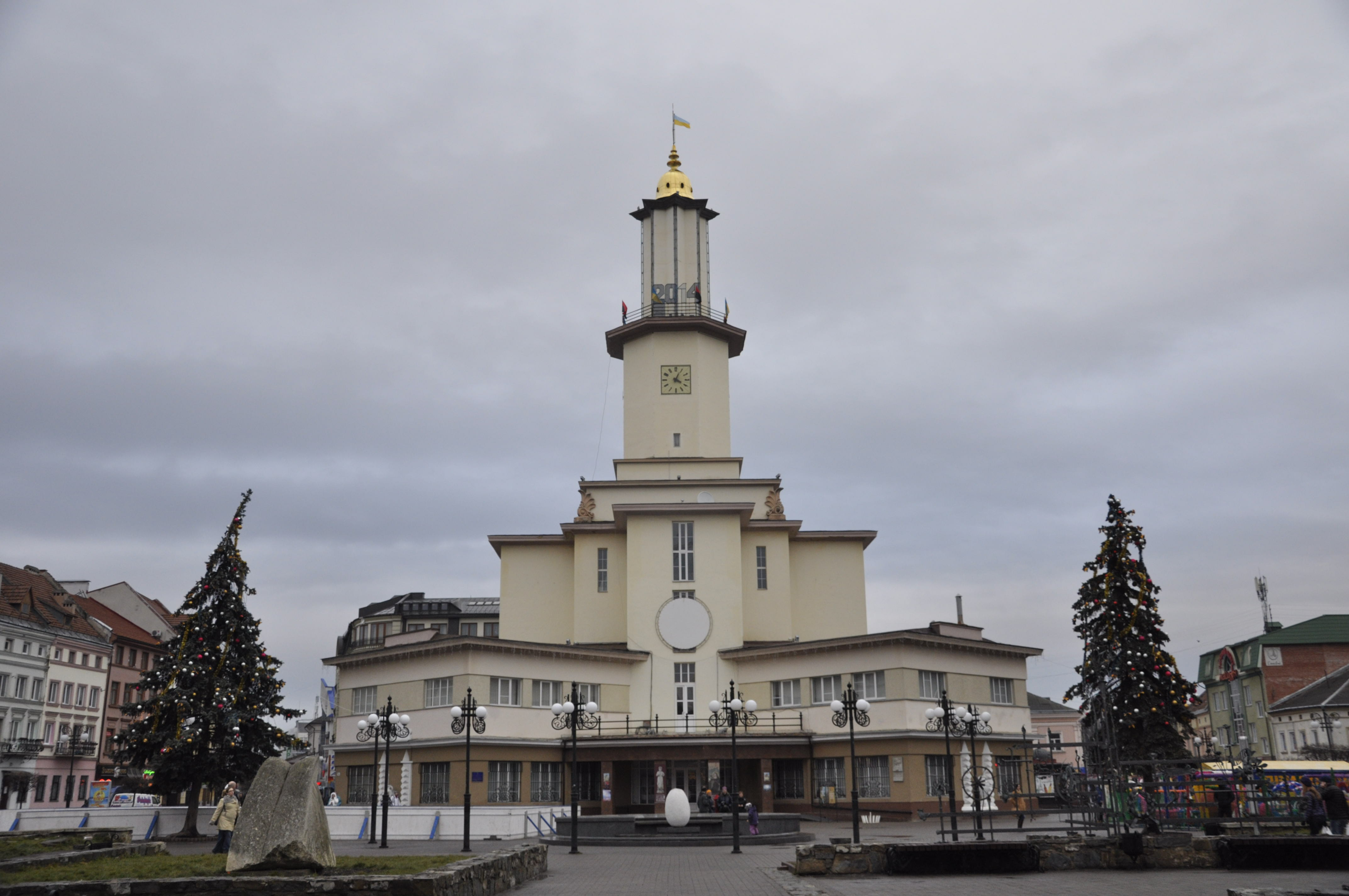
- Contemporary view from Market Square
- Interactive map of the Ratusha area

General information
- Architectural style: Art Deco
- Location: 4a Halych Street, Ivano-Frankivsk, Ukraine
- Coordinates: 48.922771°N 24.710459°E
- Current tenants: Ivano-Frankivsk Regional Museum
- Construction started: 1928
- Completed: 1935
- Renovated: 1958
- Owner: City government

Height
- Height: 49.5 m (162 ft 5 in)

Design and construction
- Architect: Stanisław Trela (1928)
- Other designers: Karol Benoe (1695); Filip Pokutyński (1870)
- Main contractor: Engineer Krash and Co.

Immovable Monument of Local Significance of Ukraine
- Official name: Колишня ратуша (Former town hall)
- Type: Architecture
- Reference no.: 1806-ІФ

Ratusha (Ukrainian: Івано-Франківська ратуша; Polish: Ratusz) is a several stories-tall building in the downtown (Old Town) of the city of Ivano-Frankivsk, Ukraine. Formerly, it served as the town hall (Rathaus in German and ratusz in Polish, hence the name) and now houses the Ivano-Frankivsk Regional History, Crafts and Culture Museum and an observation deck. It is located in the center, at the city's Market Square (Ploshcha Rynok in Ukrainian).

It is the only town hall in Ukraine built in the Art Deco style (part of the Modern Style). The current design was created in the 1920s by Polish architect Stanisław Trela, while the original building was built when the city was founded, in the 17th century. The building is constructed such that from a top view it is reminiscent of the Polish order of Virtuti Militari (Military Valor).

== History ==
=== First couple of designs ===
At the beginning the ratusz in Stanisławów was erected in the middle of a fortress which developed into the city of Stanisławów acquiring its city rights from Count Andrzej Potocki in 1662. It is not known exactly when the construction started, but the Ratusz was first mentioned to be built out of wood in 1666. Presumably that was a temporary structure as in 1672 it was replaced by a nine-story tall building made out wood and rock of the late Renaissance style. The building as it planned was used for meeting of the city administration and court as a town hall. The town hall was also used as an observation post. However, already in 1677, after the city withstood the Turkish siege it was simply disassembled.

Some twenty years by the request of Józef Potocki a building of new Ratusz was initiated. For that purpose the architect Karol Benoe was invited, who finished the project in 1695. According to Kowalczyk, the architecture of that building was reminiscent with the style of Sebastiano Serlio. The new building was built after a similar Ratusz design in Husiatyn, only higher. In total the new building had nine floors. The Ratusz was topped with a small dome-type roof, on top of which was placed a sculptural ensemble of Archangel Michael who was defeating a serpent. In 1825 Archangel Michael was replaced with an eagle. On the level of a fifth floor on each of its tower four sides were placed clocks that every 15 minutes would engage a system of bells installed underneath the dome. The floor was encircled by an observation balcony. The second and third floors of the Ratusz were designated for the city administration while its first floor was leased for various trade shops (stores) which at some point accounted for up to 24. In the basement of the Ratusz was created a jail.

There also was a single entrance from the western side through a gate upon which was placed a family coat of arms of Potocki. At the southern side was installed an iron statue of a Jewish bread salesman with a sign "jeden grosz" to show how cheap bread is in the city. In 1801 the city's magistrate was evacuated from the building, which was passed to the Austrian authorities. Since then the ratusz was used as a jail and a military clothing store. In 1825 a big storm torn away the sculpture of the archangel. On September 28, 1868, a great fire took place in the city. Originating on the southern side it spread throughout the rest of the city burning down the ratusz as well. Out of the town hall was left only its steel framework. After 200 years, the building was destroyed for the first time.

=== Late 19th century ===
The rebuilding of the rathaus, however, started rather quickly, and in 1870 in the city the construction of a new Ratusz by a Lviv construction company was initiated. The architects of the new building were Anastazy Przybyłowski and Filip Pokutyński. On June 6, 1870, a foundation of the new rathaus was installed. Inside of the foundation was placed a capsule with a parchment about the history of the rathaus and old Polish and Austrian coins and medals. The construction was finished the next year, in 1871.

The new rathaus was in the form of a massive two-story building with a tall tower (preserved from the previous design). Up to the fifth floor it was covered with a white marble. Over it were placed observation galleries, over which a clock hung on the four sides of the tower. A nearly spherical elongated dome topped the building. The main feature of the rathaus was the session hall of the city's council. In the basement of the building once again were located rooms of preliminary detention (arrest home). During World War I in February 1915 several military engagements took place in the vicinity of Stanisławów, from which the rathaus received numerous cracks. The building itself did not fall; however, it was announced to be in emergency conditions.

=== 20th century ===
After World War I, the war in Eastern Europe continued on until the 1920s as old empires were falling apart, particularly due to change of power in the former Russian Empire. In the first years after the war Poland went through some difficult financial times and it took some time before the government decided to restore the old city hall. In 1929, the Polish government engaged Krash and Company, engineers, to work on the rathaus. That December, the local government accepted a bid on the building and in 1930 accepted a design from architect Stanisław Trela. During the installation of the foundation of the building's south-eastern wing, workers installed a time capsule containing plans of the new design, photos of the old rathaus, and other documents. Initial plans had the construction finished in 1932, but, due to lack of financing, the construction continued until 1935, while decorative work continued until World War II.

The rathaus survived World War II. The building design represents a cross (the Order of Virtuti Militari). At the intersection of the cross rises a tower topped with a dome which is reminiscent of a military helmet. On the fourth floor at each corner were placed bronze eagles that represent the Polish state symbol of the (white eagle). During renovations in 1957 those "ideologically alien" creations were replaced with inexpressive sculptural decorations. The complete height of the rathaus is 49.5 m (162 ft), a height that at the time of construction made it the tallest structure in the city. Unlike the previous versions of the building, it was not used as a town hall, but rather as a symbolic representation of the past. The space in the building was leased to numerous stores which, after the "Golden September" (the Soviet term for the invasion of Poland in 1939), were closed.

During the Nazi occupation Hitler's followers tried to destroy the building. However, they were unable to blow it up as the rathaus was built out of reinforced concrete. The Germans managed, however, to blow up its northwestern wing; they ran out of time to destroy the rest of the building. After the Soviet conquest the building was used as a warehouse. In 1957 the oblast Regional Administration financed a renovation project that continued until 1958. On April 26, 1959 the building reopened as a regional museum, which it still houses today.
