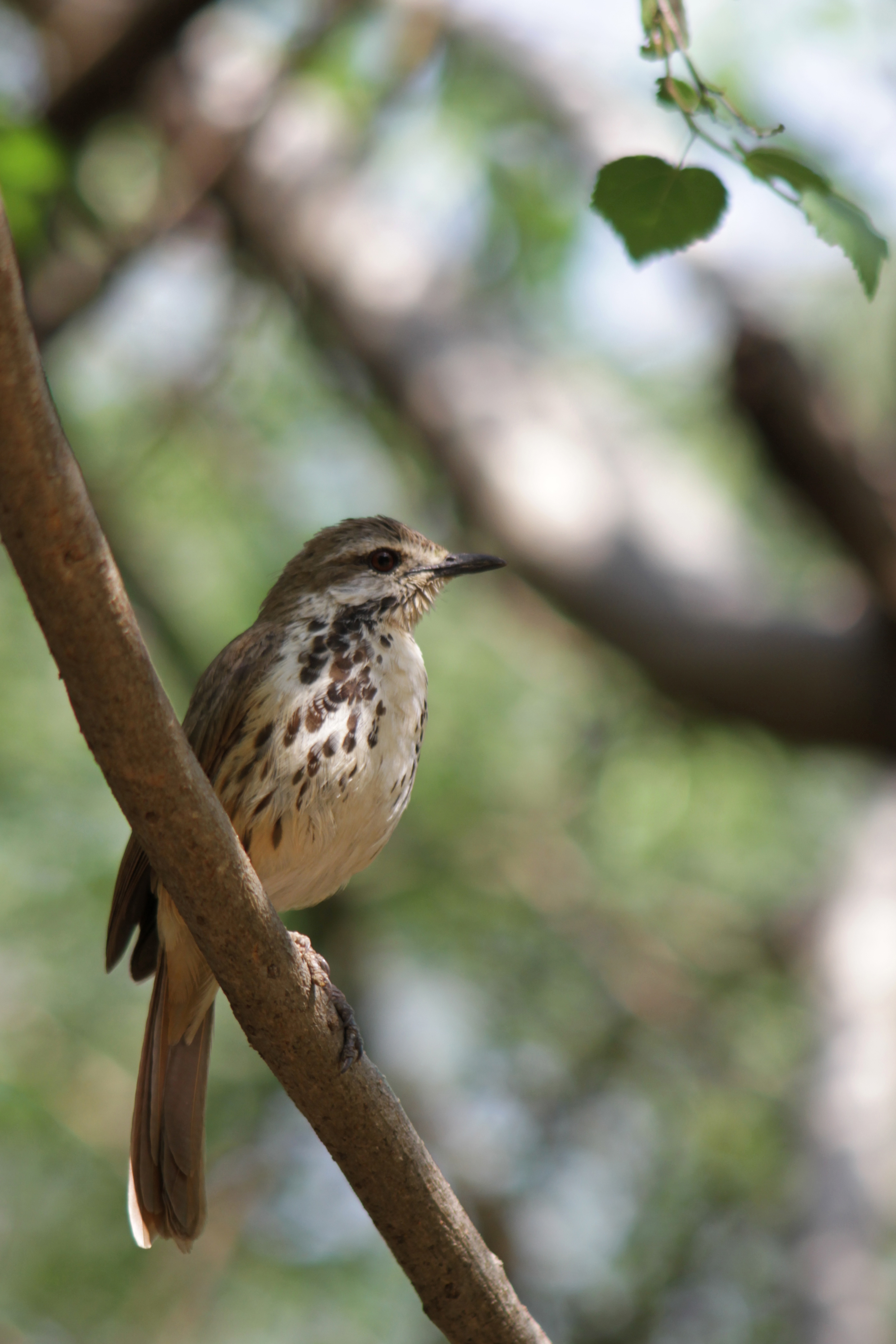
- Spotted palm thrush, (Cichladusa guttata)

Scientific classification
- Kingdom: Animalia
- Phylum: Chordata
- Class: Aves
- Order: Passeriformes
- Family: Muscicapidae
- Subfamily: Erithacinae
- Genus: Cichladusa; W. Peters, 1863

Type species
- Cichladusa arquata W. Peters, 1863

Species
- See text.

= Palm thrush =

Palm thrushes

Genus of birds

The palm thrushes are medium-sized insectivorous birds in the genus Cichladusa. They were formerly in the thrush family Turdidae, but are now treated as part of the Old World flycatcher Muscicapidae.

These are tropical African species which nest in palm trees or buildings.

The genus includes the following species:

- Collared palm thrush, Cichladusa arquata
- Rufous-tailed palm thrush, Cichladusa ruficauda
- Spotted palm thrush, Cichladusa guttata
