= Peter Dengate Thrush =

New Zealand barrister

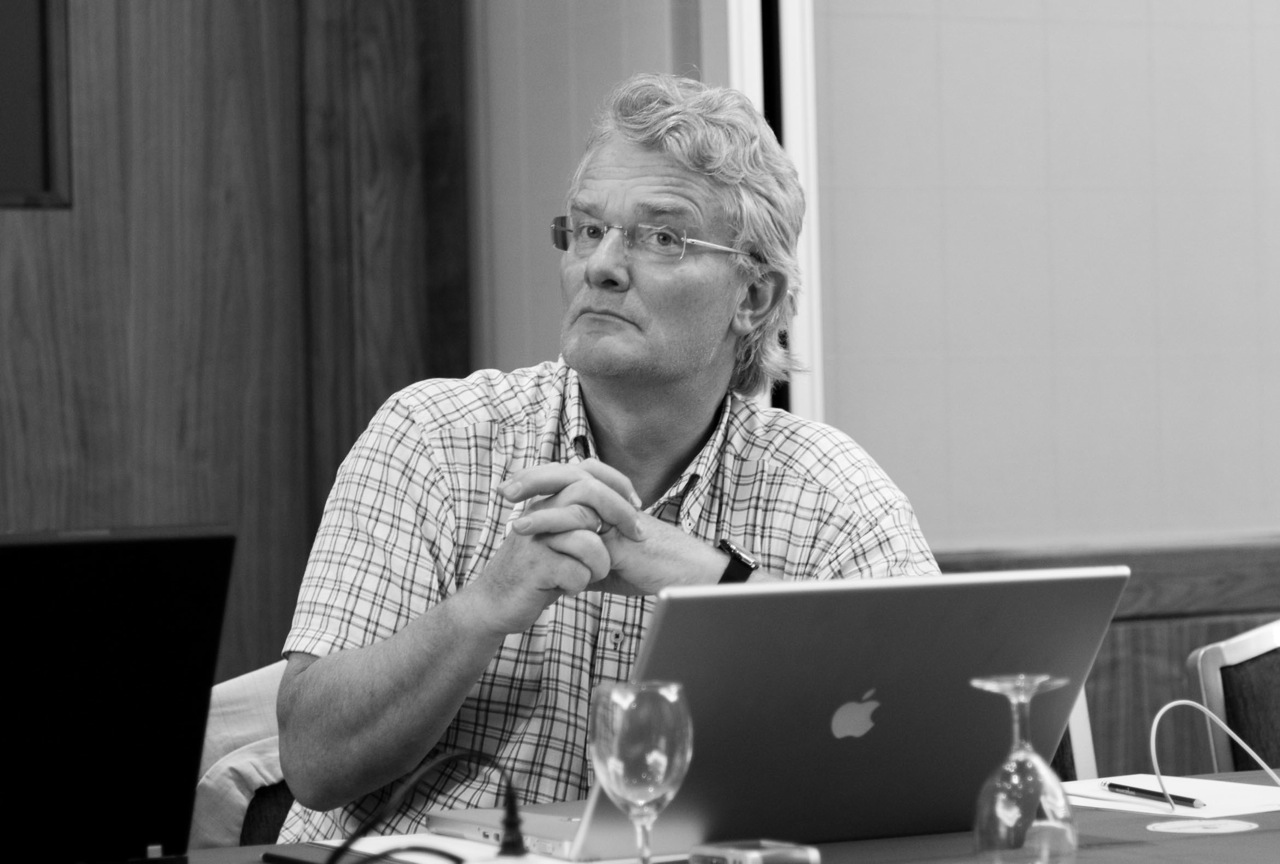

Chairman of the Board of ICANN
- In office November 2007 – June 2011
- Preceded by: Vint Cerf
- Incumbent
- Assumed office June 2011

Executive Chairman of TDLH

Personal details
- Born: New Zealand
- Occupation: Barrister

Peter Dengate Thrush (born 1956), also known as PDT, is a New Zealander barrister specialising in Internet law. In November 2007, he was appointed Chairman of the Board of ICANN, taking over the role from Vint Cerf.

Dengate Thrush was made a fellow at the InternetNZ annual meeting in August 2008 in recognition of his contributions to Internet policy issues both in New Zealand and internationally.

After his Term at ICANN ended in June 2011, Dengate Thrush switched to Top Level Domain Holdings (TLDH), the parent company of Minds+Machines, where he was appointed Executive Chairman.
