= West Ukrainian University of Economics and Law =

Ukrainian University

Coordinates: 48°55′19″N 24°42′45″E

- Західноукраїнський економіко-правничий університет
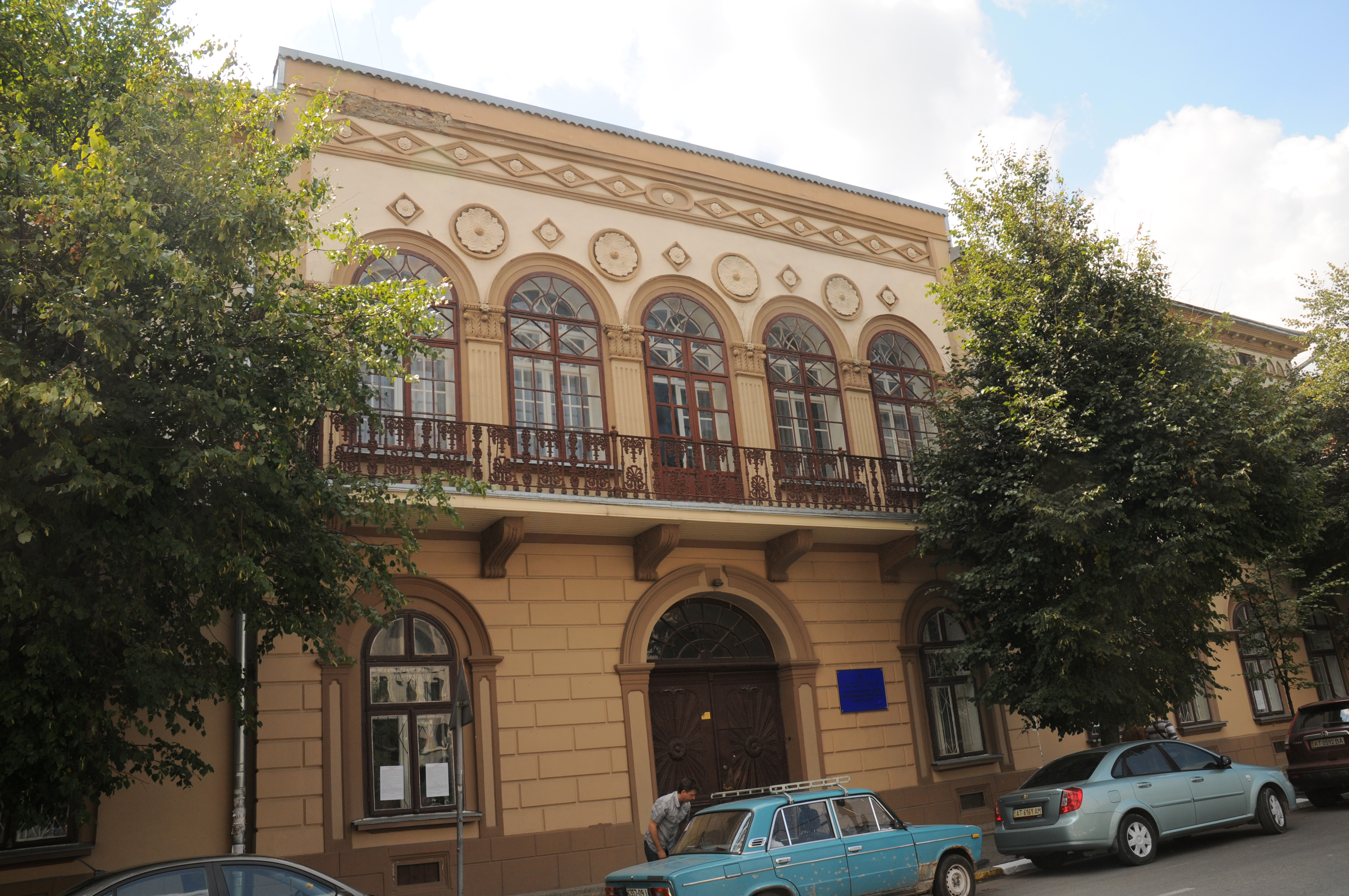
- Established: 1991
- Rector: Yaroslav Gryta
- Students: 2 000
- Location: Ivano-Frankivsk, Ukraine

West Ukrainian University of Economics and Law is a Ukrainian University in Ivano-Frankivsk.

== History ==
The university started its activities in Bukovina in 1991 as a Ukrainian Free Institute of Management and Business (UVIMB). From 1995 as Czernowitz School of Economics and Law (Economics and Law Institute in Chernivtsi).

The university was re-registered in 2003 on the basis Ivano-Frankivsk Faculty of Law and Business Economics, which was acted as a structural unit of Czernowitz School of Economics and Law from 1992. It is now Czernowitz School of Economics and Law is detached structural divisions of the university.

== Institutes and faculties ==
2 Faculties function in the structure of the university.

- Faculty of Economics
- Faculty of Law
