= Teodor Lubomirski =

Polish nobleman

- Prince Lubomirski
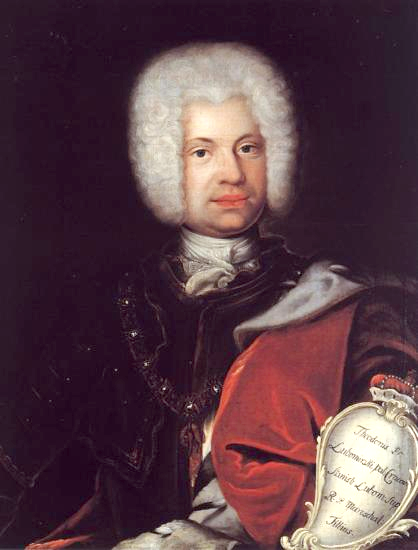
- Born: 17 August 1683
- Died: 6 February 1745 (aged 61); Ujazdów Castle, Warsaw
- Buried: Czerniaków
- Noble family: Lubomirski
- Consort: Elżbieta Culler-Cuming (m. 1721; died 1745)
- Issue: Anna Lubomirska; Kasper Lubomirski
- Father: Stanisław Herakliusz Lubomirski
- Mother: Elżbieta Denhoff

Prince Jan Teodor Józef Konstanty Lubomirski (17 August 1683 – 6 February 1745) was a Polish nobleman who became Starost, Voivode and Sejm Marshal. He was a Field marshal of the Archduchy of Austria and was made a Knight of the Order of the White Eagle in 1730 and a Knight of the Order of the Golden Fleece in 1734.

== Early life ==
He was the oldest son of Prince Stanisław Herakliusz Lubomirski and, his second wife, Elżbieta Denhoff. From his father's first marriage to Zofia Opalińska (the daughter of Court Marshal Łukasz Opaliński), he had an elder half-sister, Princess Elżbieta Lubomirska, who married Count Adam Mikołaj Sieniawski. (Note: After their father died in 1702, his sister, Princess Elżbieta Sieniawska, inherited many of his estates, including Puławy, Łubnice, Siekierki, Czerniaków and many other properties in Warsaw. She was considered the most powerful woman in the Commonwealth and was called "the uncrowned Queen of Poland".) From his parents' marriage, he had at least two brothers, Prince Franciszek Lubomirski, who became General of the Crown Army, and Prince Józef Lubomirski, who also became Voivode.

His paternal grandparents were Marshal and Hetman Jerzy Sebastian Lubomirski and Konstancja Ligęza. His maternal grandparents were Teodor Denhoff, the Grand Chamberlain of the Crown, and Katarzyna Franciszka von Bessen, mistress of king John II Casimir Vasa. His maternal uncle was Cardinal Jan Kazimierz Denhoff.

== Career ==
In 1700, he received the wealthy Starosty (essentially a senior royal administrative official) of Spiš from his father. Immediately afterwards, he fled abroad with his father's mistress, not returning until after his father's death in 1702. He became the heir to Czerniaków and Ujazdów near Warsaw (which his father bought in 1674), and after the suicide of his brother Franciszek in 1721, he received the extensive Lańcut estate (which his great-grandfather Stanisław Lubomirski bought in 1629). Through acquisition, he gradually acquired a large complex of estates in the Rzeszów region; he was the owner of Połonne (a former royal town which had been granted to his great-grandfather Stanisław).

He took part in the Great Northern War against King Augustus II. In 1711, he obtained Augustus II's pardon and the return of the Spiš district office. For almost twenty years, he took no part in public life.

=== Political career ===
Lubomirski was a member of the Sejm (the lower house of the Polish Parliament) from the Kraków Voivodeship in 1729 and 1730, serving as Sejm Marshal, the Speaker of the Sejm, leading the extraordinary Sejms on 22–27 August 1729 and 2–14 October 1730 in Grodno. From 1732 he was the Voivode (essentially a governor) of Kraków Voivodeship. He was a member of the General Confederation established on 27 April 1733 at the Convocation Sejm. He was an elector of Augustus III in 1733 and signed his pacta conventa. In 1735 he signed the resolution of the General Council of the Warsaw Confederation. In 1736 he was appointed Senator-Resident (Senatorowie rezydenci).

On 4 December 1736, he was promoted to the rank of Field Marshal. In the same year, he became head of the Cuirassier Regiment, later the Czech Dragoon Regiment No. 2.

He spent much time in Vienna and Austria, where he acquired landed estates in 1740. At the Pacification Sejm in 1736, he torpedoed a project for new taxes and effectively thwarted an attempt at state reform. On 10 July 1737, he signed a concordat with the Holy See in Wschowa. He was also a member of the Sejm in 1740, sharply criticizing the idea of expanding the army.

== Personal life ==
In 1721, he married Elizabeth Mariana "Elżbieta" (née Culler-Cuming) Kristicz (1689–1776), of the Scottish Culler-Cuming family who was the former wife of Kraków merchant Jan Kristicz. Together, they had two children:

- Princess Anna Lubomirska (1722–1771), who married Count Miklós "Nicholas" Esterházy de Galántha, the Austrian Envoy to Russia from 1753 to 1761 who was the eldest son of Count Ferenc Esterházy and Countess Maria Szidónia Pálffy ab Erdöd (a daughter of Count János Pálffy), in 1744.
- Prince Kasper Lubomirski (1724–1780), a Lieutenant general of the Russian Army; he married Princess Barbara Ponińska Lubomirska, the youngest daughter of Prince Jerzy Ignacy Lubomirski and Baroness Joanna von Stein zu Jettingen (a daughter of Baron Franz Marquard von Stain zu Jettingen).

Towards the end of his life, he became more devout, which led to the construction of a Calvary with 33 chapels at the Ujazdów Church, a church in Boguchwała, and a Dominican Church and monastery in Łańcut. Lubomirski also supported the Collegium Nobilium.

Suffering from gout, he died in Ujazdów on 6 February 1745 and was buried in the Church of St. Anthony of Padua in Czerniaków. After settling his estate, his widow Elizabeth, moved to Vienna in 1748 with their daughter Anna, who had married the Hungarian magnate Nicholas Esterházy. Elizabeth died in Vienna on 26 October 1776.
