= Jerzy Aleksander Lubomirski =

Polish noble (died 1735)

- Prince
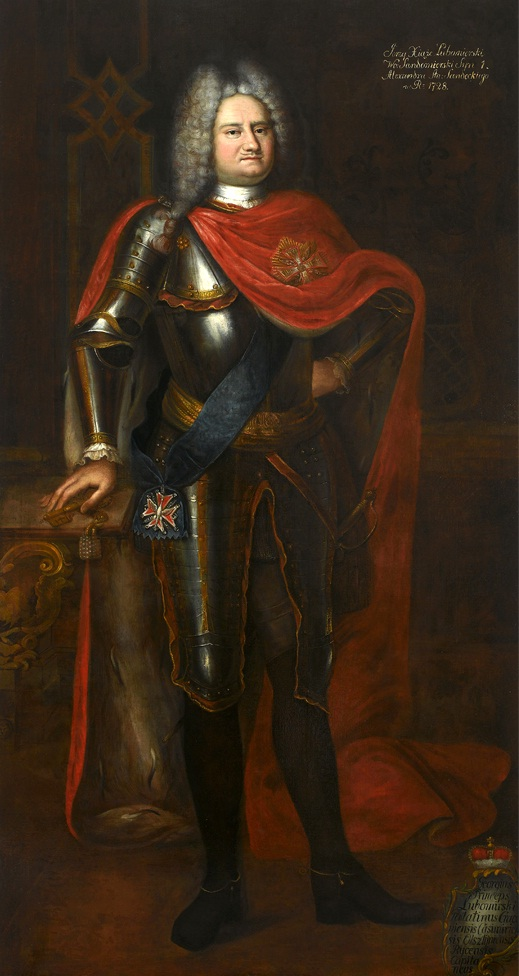
- Portrait of Prince Jerzy Aleksander Lubomirski.

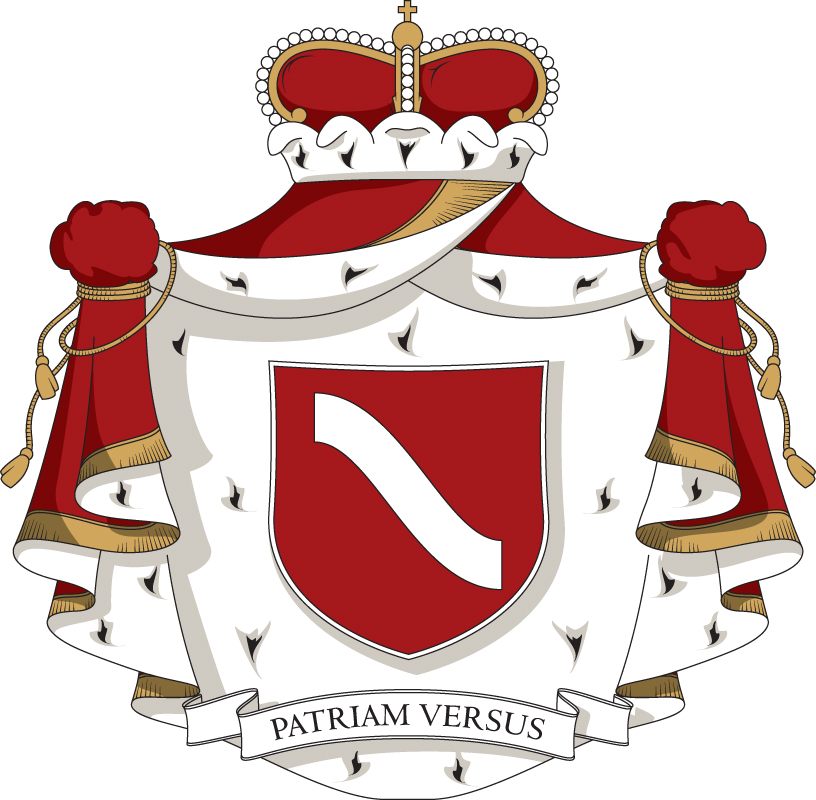
- Coat of arms
- Born: 17th century
- Died: 1735
- Family: Lubomirski
- Consort: Joanna von Starzhausen; Aniela Teresa Michowska
- Issue: with Joanna von Starzhausen; Anna Karolina Lubomirska; Józef Lubomirski; Stanisław Lubomirski
- Father: Aleksander Michał Lubomirski
- Mother: Katarzyna Anna Sapieha

Prince Jerzy Aleksander Lubomirski (died 1735) was a Polish noble (szlachcic).

Jerzy was Camp Leader of the Crown since 1703, voivode of Sandomierz Voivodship since 1729 and starost of Nowy Sącz.

== Ancestry ==
16. Count Sebastian Lubomirski
8. Prince Stanisław Lubomirski
17. Anna Branicka
4. Prince Jerzy Sebastian Lubomirski
18. Prince Aleksander Ostrogski
9. Princess Zofia Ostrogska
19. Anna Kostka
2. Prince Aleksander Michał Lubomirski
10. Mikołaj Spytek Ligęza
21. Elżbieta Jordanówna
5. Konstancja Ligęza von Borrek
22. Stanisław Krasiński
11. Zofia Krasińska
23. Anna Michowska
1. Prince Jerzy Aleksander Lubomirski
24. Count Paweł Sapieha
12. Prince Jan Piotr Sapieha
25. Hanna Chodkiewiczówna
6. Prince Paweł Jan Sapieha
13. Zofia Weiher
3. Princess Katarzyna Anna Sapieha
7. Anna Barbara Kopeć
