= Stanisław Lubomirski =

Stanisław Lubomirski may refer to:

- Stanisław Lubomirski (d. 1577), Polish nobleman
- Stanisław Lubomirski (1583–1649), Polish-Lithuanian nobleman
- Stanisław Herakliusz Lubomirski (1642–1702), Polish nobleman
- Stanisław Lubomirski (1704–1793), Polish noble and magnate
- Stanisław Lubomirski (1722–1782), Polish nobleman
