= Jerzy Lubomirski =

Jerzy Lubomirski is the name of several Polish noblemen:

- Jerzy Sebastian Lubomirski (1616–1667), Polish nobleman and prince, leader of the Lubomirski Rebellion
- Jerzy Dominik Lubomirski (1654–1727), Polish noble
- Jerzy Aleksander Lubomirski (17th-century–1735), Polish noble
- Jerzy Ignacy Lubomirski (1687–1753), Polish nobleman
