= Elżbieta Helena Sieniawska =

Polish noblewoman (1669–1729)

- Grand Hetmaness of the Crown
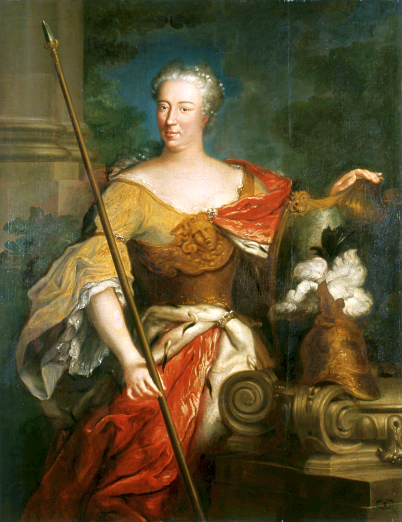
- Portrait of Elżbieta Sieniawska as Minerva
- Born: 1669; Końskowola, Poland
- Died: 21 March 1729 (aged 59–60); Oleszyce, Poland
- Noble family: Lubomirski family
- Spouse: Adam Mikołaj Sieniawski
- Issue: Maria Zofia Czartoryska
- Father: Stanisław Herakliusz Lubomirski
- Mother: Zofia Opalińska

Elżbieta Helena Sieniawska (née Lubomirska; 1669 – 21 March 1729) was a Polish noblewoman, Grand Hetmaness of the Crown (hetmanowa wielka koronna), and a renowned patron of the arts.

An influential woman politician in the Polish–Lithuanian Commonwealth during the reign of Augustus II the Strong, she was deeply embroiled in the Great Northern War and in Rákóczi's War for [Hungarian] Independence.

She was considered the most powerful woman in the Commonwealth and was called "the uncrowned Queen of Poland".

== Biography ==
=== Early life ===
Elżbieta was the only child of Prince Stanisław Herakliusz Lubomirski by his first wife Countess Zofia Opalińska. Her father, a neostoic known as the Polish Solomon, had a great influence on her education and politics. After her father's death she inherited many of his estates, including Puławy, Łubnice, Siekierki, Czerniaków and many other properties in Warsaw. She was educated in the Visitationist Sisters boarding-school in Warsaw and in 1680 she was admitted at the court as a lady-in-waiting of Queen Marie Casimire. In 1687, she married Adam Mikołaj Sieniawski, Grand Hetman of the Crown, and despite her husband's demands she stayed in Warsaw, where she got involved in a famed romance with Jan Stanisław Jabłonowski. She was reconciled with her husband, but soon after, her affair with Aleksander Benedykt Sobieski became well known. Her financial independence caused conflict with her husband and she was forced to defend her property and income from his interference. Eventually, the hetmaness achieved equilibrium within their marriage, and sometimes even underlined her leadership role in their intimate relations addressing Sieniawski as My dear Maiden in her letters. Monsieur de Mongrillon, secretary of the French Embassy in the period 1694–1698, recalled in his memoirs: she is a true Amazon [...] She smokes like a man. It is said that the Tatar ambassador who came to Poland with peace overtures came to smoke by her bed and she smoked with him.

=== Stateswoman ===
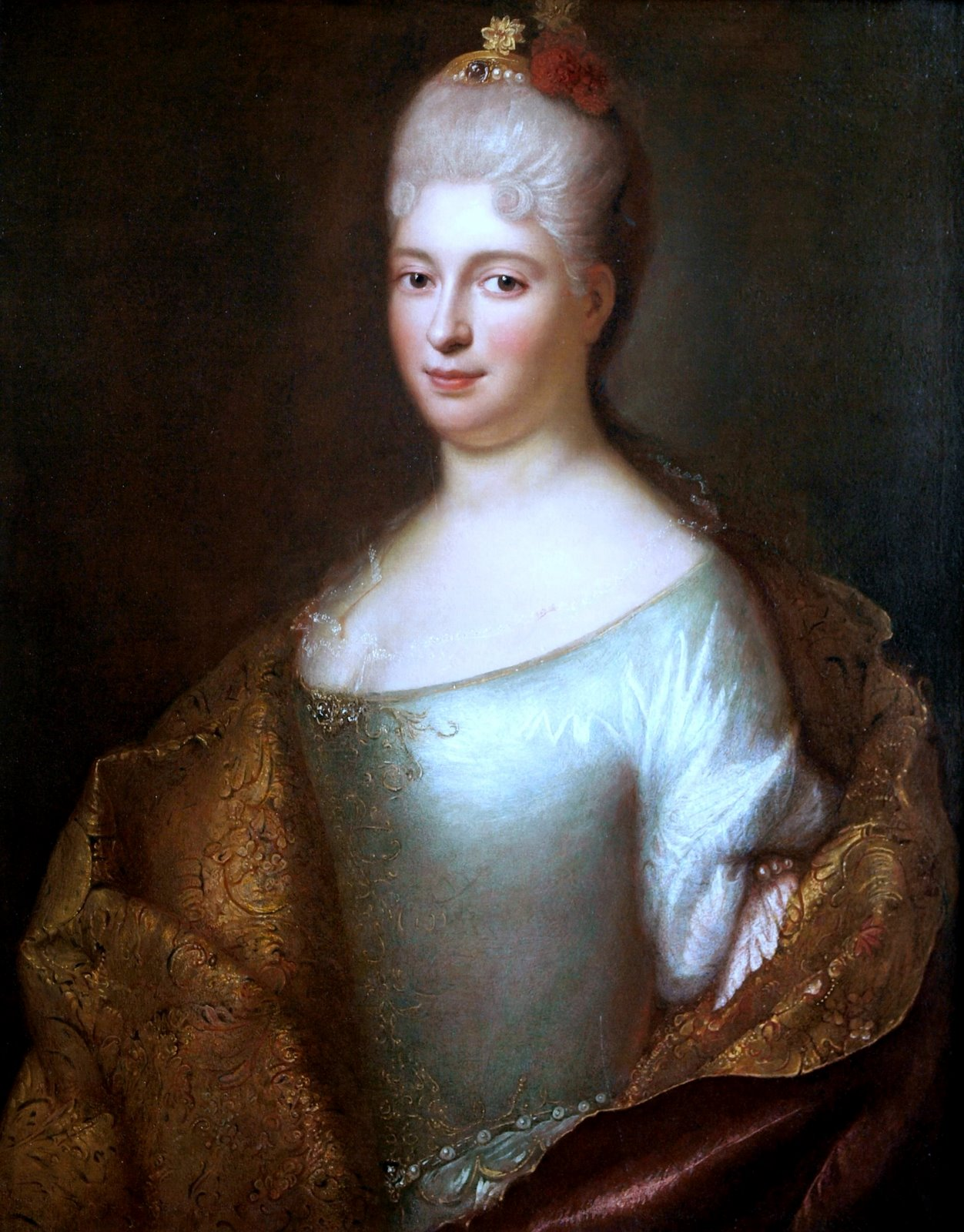
Elżbieta Sieniawska by Ádám Mányoki

The hetmaness was "a lady of great wisdom, reason and shrewdness" and she was deployed by her husband on diplomatic missions, duties and obligations that he could not cope with. Otwinowski called her "a great owner of such shrewdness that she had meetings with the whole of Europe". Others called her "a great ruler and the First Lady of the Republic" and Augustus II had her portrait amid the effigies of distinguished women. After John III Sobieski's death she supported the French candidature of François Louis, Prince of Conti for the Polish throne and became a leader of his party. When she became disillusioned with his candidature, she affiliated with Augustus II. After Queen Marie Casimire's departure to Rome, she administered her widow dowry in Warsaw. Between 1701 and 1703, due to incitement of the French diplomacy, she was involved in the anti-Habsburg insurrection in Hungary, which she financially and politically supported. The rebellion's leader Francis II Rákóczi, Prince of Transylvania, became her lover. In the Sieniawskis' estate in Berezhany, Rákóczi issued a proclamation To all Hungarians considered as the beginning of the uprising. Their discreet romance flourished in the turbulent years of war. He wrote a madrigal in French dedicated to the hetmaness and his love letters are interesting examples of epistolography. When in 1704, Jakub and Konstanty Sobieskis were kidnapped and imprisoned in Saxony, Aleksander resigned from the rivalry for the crown, afraid of revenge from his former lover (at that time Wettin partisan).

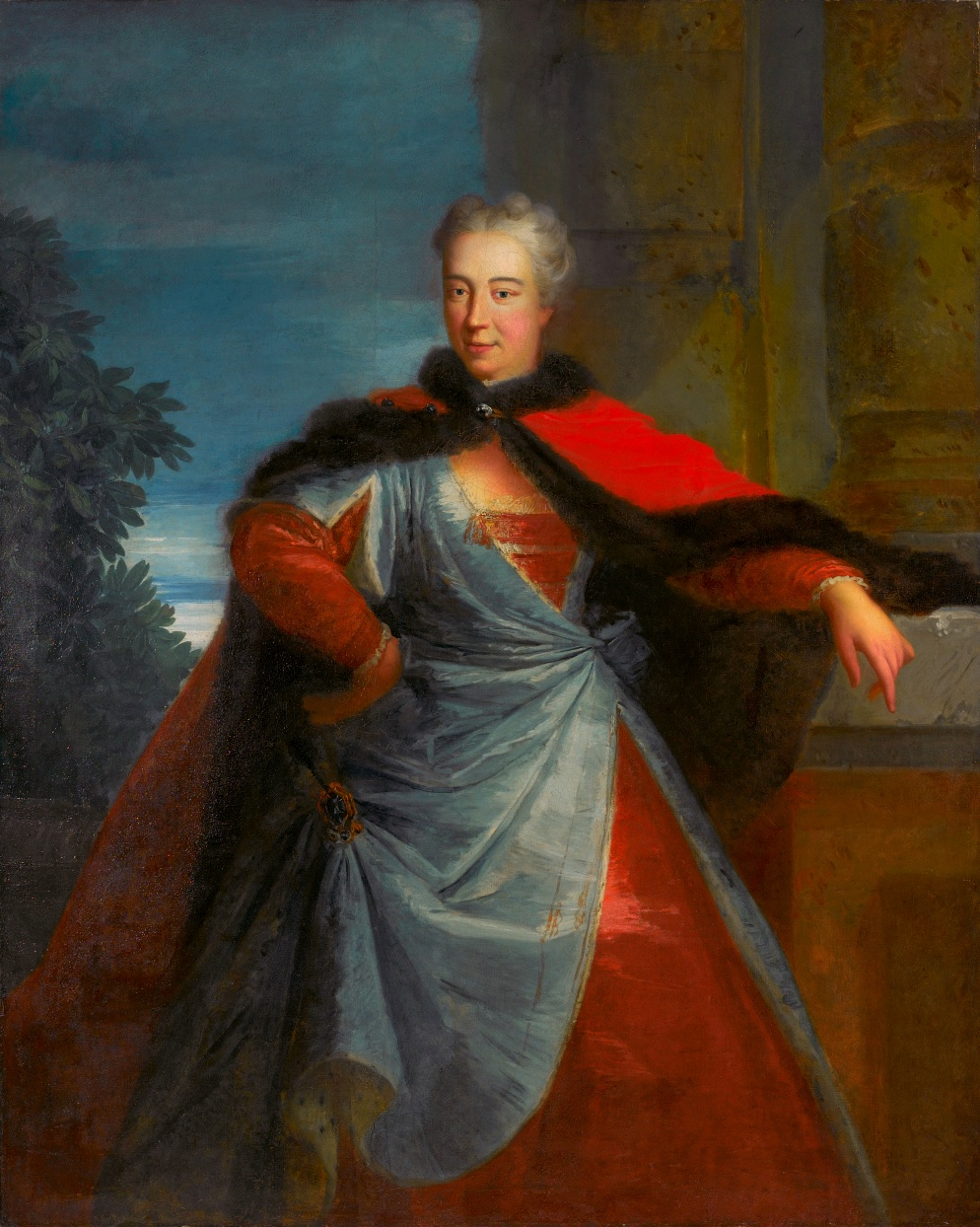
Elżbieta Sieniawska, portrayed in Sarmatian pose and in male delia cloak, by Louis de Silvestre

In 1706, after Augustus II's abdication, she engaged in the negotiations to reach an agreement between the tsar Peter I of Russia and king Charles XII of Sweden. During the negotiations she met with her former lover Jabłonowski, King Leszczyński's envoy. Sieniawska was abducted in November 1707 by the Swedish Army and met with the king himself. She was released after a month due to French mediation. After Augustus' abdication Sieniawska's husband become one of the most significant players in the struggle for Polish crown. He was considered as one of the leaders of the Sandomierz Confederation, and starting from 1707 he negotiated with the Tsar Peter I his own candidature to the throne. But his wife strongly opposed his candidacy and threatened him with divorce. She did however support the candidature of her lover Francis Rákóczi as the most appropriate in a very difficult political situation of the Serenissima. With a support of a French diplomat Jean Victor de Besenval she was involved in peace mediations. After the declaration of interregnum in the Commonwealth in July 1707 an agreement was reached and on 8 August 1707 the Lublin Council was appointed. Because of robberies and other abuses by Russian troops, Sejm began to enforce the Sieniawska's protegee. When those plans failed, she endeavoured to legalise Leszczyński's election and to remove all foreign troops from the country. In her politics, she also aimed to reduce the Russian influences in the Commonwealth. She was an unscrupulous politician participating in political affairs on a large scale, establishing secret contacts with different camps and conducting various personal intrigues – Charles XII of Sweden referred to her as "that most accursed woman".

Since 1709, she fostered Konstanty's candidature to the throne (he visited her together with Stanisław Leszczyńksi in Lviv in Spring 1709), and though she was against the Wettin restoration, she could accommodate to Augustus II being already in possession of the Polish crown. To the baptism of her only daughter in 1711 in Jarosław she invited the powerful of the age. Among the godparents were Tsar Peter I, King Augustus II and prince Rákóczi, accompanied by about 15000 soldiers. The tsar Peter I was attracted by her unusual intelligence and it is believed that she became his mistress. During his stay in Jaworów in May 1711, according to the French ambassador Sieur Baluze, they talked endlessly and built a boat together.

=== Later life ===
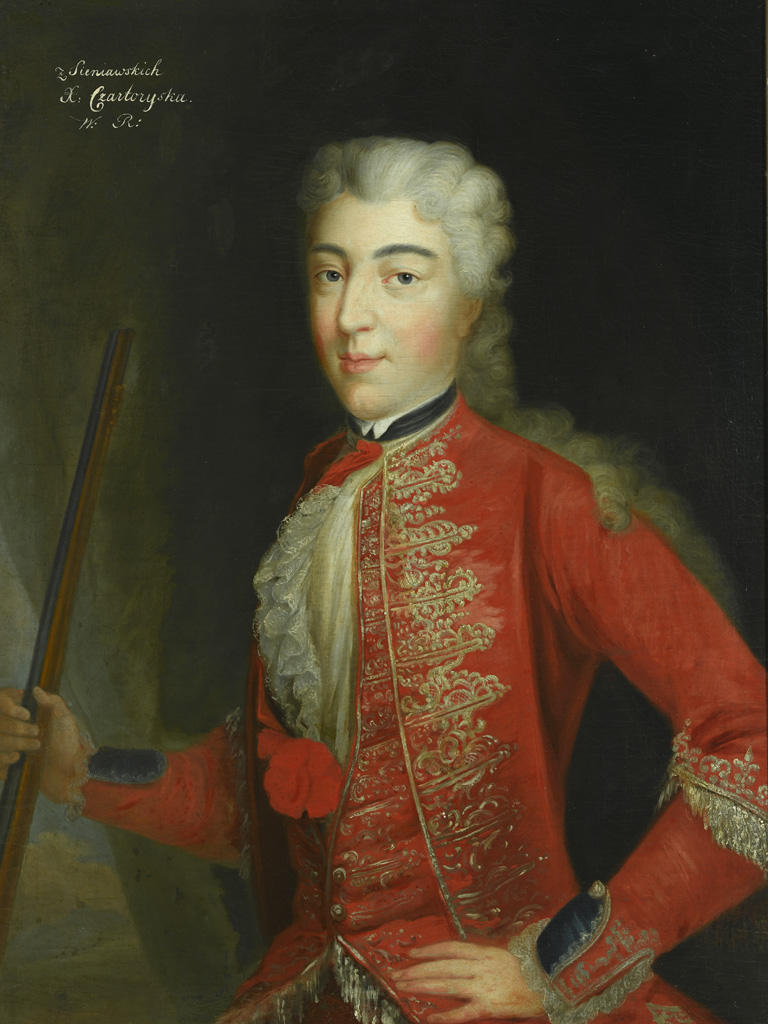
Maria Zofia Czartoryska, heiress of Sieniawska's fortune

In the following years, the hetmaness retired from politics, and concentrated on administration of her vast estates and their economic development. In one of her letters of 17 July 1726 Sieniawska reprimanded an accountant in the Tenczyn Castle, Monsieur Zabagłowicz:

Your letter of today's post has reached me here and you describe everything in it very heedlessly, only to slobber the post, it is the way you care about the propriety but remember you can take it on the chin.

Among her close collaborators were Końskowola canon Andrzej Stanisław Tucci and a Jewish woman Feyga Leybowiczowa, to whom she entrusted the management of mills and inns in Końskowola. She also supported Jewish settlement on her lands (on 2 May 1718 she issued a privilege for the Jews to settle in Staszów and build a synagogue).

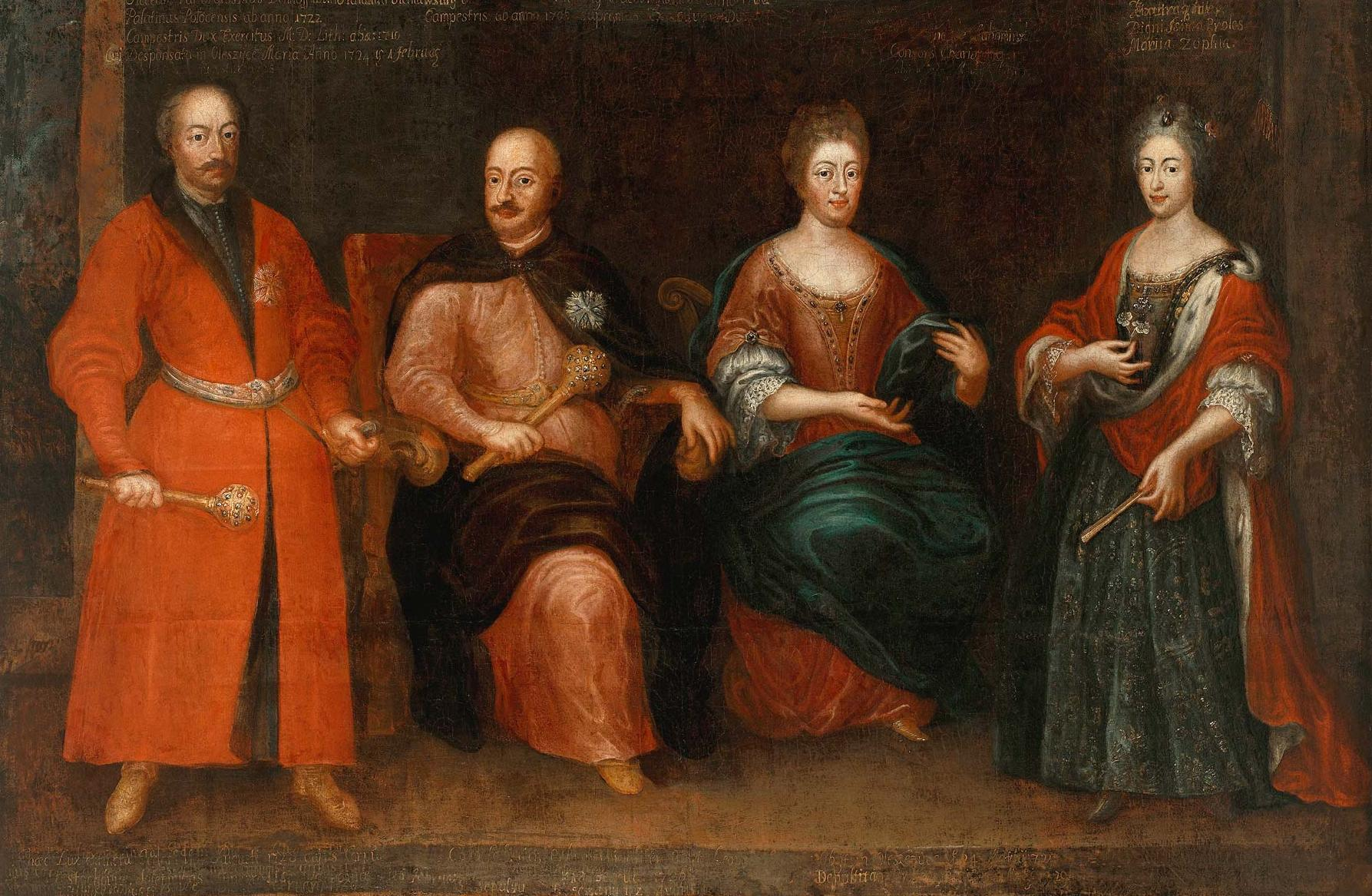
Sieniawski family, 1724–1726

She also focused on constructional foundations. In 1720, she established the new orangery of the Wilanów Palace, in 1722 she started the reconstruction of the Puławy Palace and in 1730 she enlarged the Łubnice Palace, at that time artistic center of Sieniawska's properties. From Konstanty she purchased Olesko and Ternopil and in 1720 the Sobieskis colifichet de gentillesse (the most pleasant trinket) – Wilanów Palace. Among her most notable foundations are the church and monastery for the Capuchin friars in Lviv founded in 1708 and accomplished in 1718, the wooden mansion in Oleszyce (1713), a palace-orangery in Sieniawa (1718), the Discalced Carmelite Sisters Church in Lublin (before 1721), the palace in Wysocko (1720s), the two storied palace in Przybysławice (1720s), reconstruction of the Founding of Holy Cross Parish Church in Końskowola (1724), the St. Elisabeth's Church in Powsin (1725), reconstruction of the Lubomirski Palace in Lublin (1725–1728) – some of them she erected together with her husband. When Sieniawska's daughter widowed in 1728 her new marriage become a significant matter, not only in the Commonwealth but also in Europe. After her father's death in 1726 Maria Zofia inherited his Ruthenian estates including 35 towns, 235 villages and Berezhany fortress, she was also the only inheritor of her husband's estates and of her mother's fortune. Among the candidates to the hand of one of the wealthiest women in Europe were Charles de Bourbon-Condé, Count of Charolais supported by France (Louis XV even invited Maria Zofia to Versailles), Portuguese infante Dom Manuel de Bragança supported by the Habsburgs (proposed as the next King of Poland, due to the tenets of the Löwenwolde's Treaty), Jan Klemens Branicki, Franciszek Salezy Potocki, Jan Tarło and August Aleksander Czartoryski, who eventually won the competition full of duels and speech encounters due to support of Augustus II, as the latter was afraid of increase of power of his opponents.

== Patronage ==
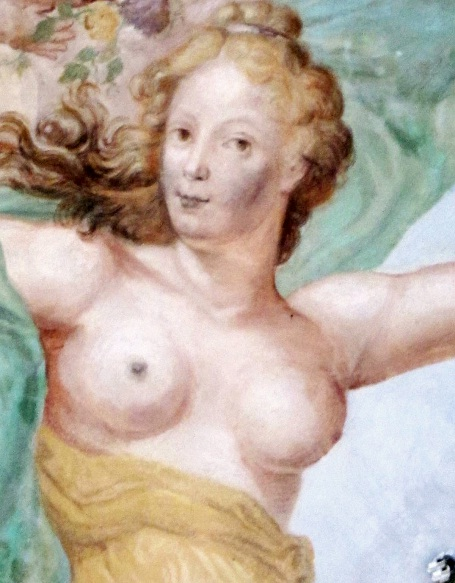
Elżbieta Sieniawska as Flora by Giuseppe Rossi

Through her extensive contacts from Neuburg court, through Prague, Vienna and Wrocław, the hetmaness brought to Poland many renowned artists. Ádám Mányoki, Rákóczi's court painter, before he was appointed official court painter of Augustus II was at Sieniawska's service in Warsaw since 1713. She employed the most prominent artists active in the Commonwealth. Among them there were architects Giovanni Spazzio, Józef Fontana, Karol Bay, Efraim Szreger and František Mayer of Moravia, painters Jan Jerzy Plersch and Giuseppe Rossi, eminent sculptors of Bohemian Baroque Jan Elijáš and Hynek Hoffmanns, stucco decorators Francesco Fumo and Pietro Innocente Comparetti, gardener Georg Zeidler of Saxony. She also employed Dresden court artists such as Johann Sigmund Deybel, Louis de Silvestre and sculptor Jean-Joseph Vinache and was a patron of young talented artists, like Julius Perty son of her architect Jacob, who was trained in Charles de Prevot's atelier in Sandomierz between 1726 and 1730. Among her protegees was also a poet Elżbieta Drużbacka known as the Sarmatian Muse.

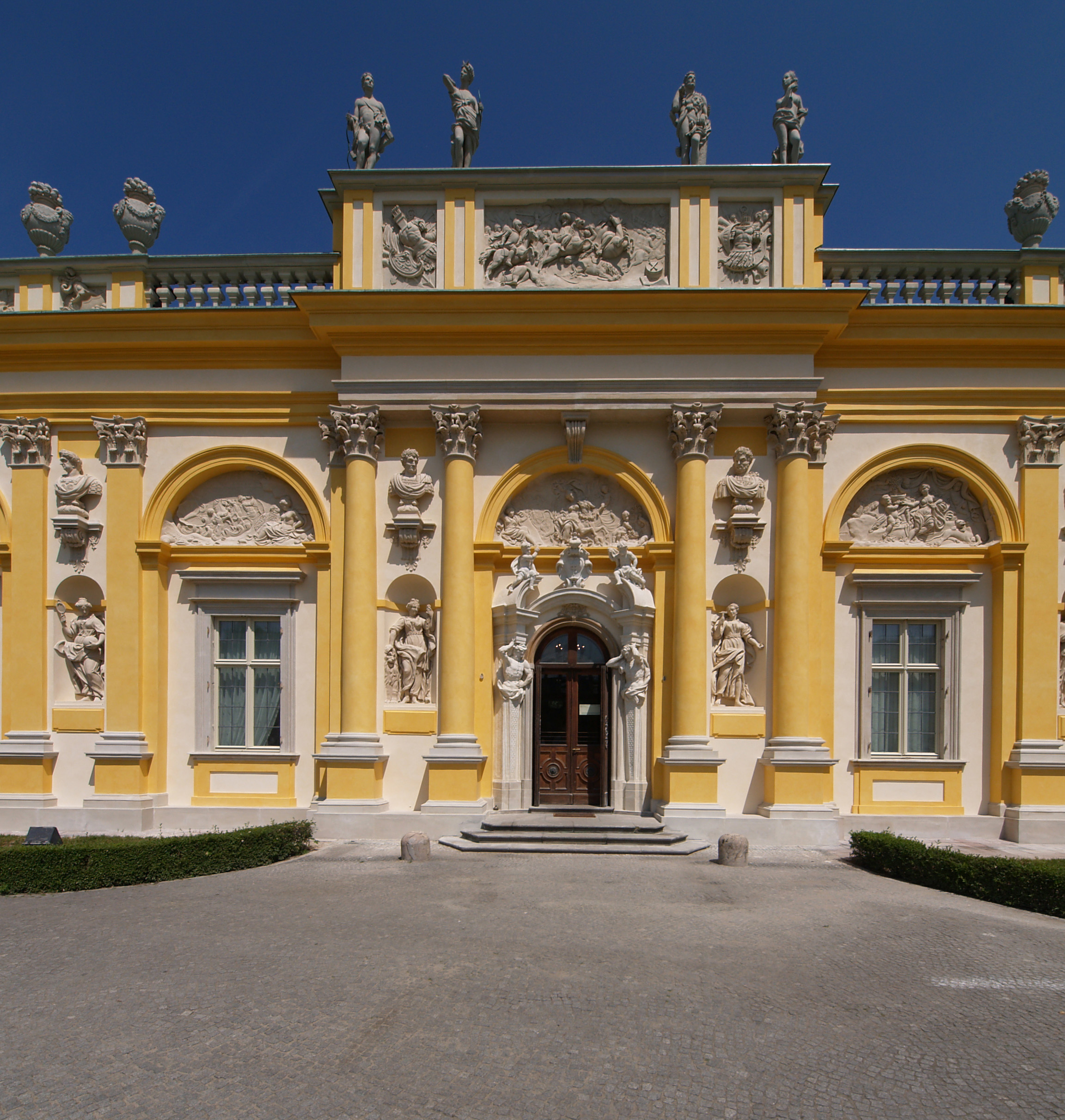
The Wilanów Palace wings were constructed by Sieniawska between 1720 and 1729.

In 1713, the king Augustus II purchased the Morsztyn Palace and neighbouring allotments and started the construction of a new palace – so called Saxon Palace. Modelled after Versailles, it was the largest building in Warsaw, apart from the Sobieski's Marywil. It was a time of late baroque and rococo, when theatrum mundi, with its theatrical decorations played an essential role, not only in founder's glorification but also in politics to confirm the status. That is why the facade of the new palace was considered as rather poor (all the major funds were intended to embellished the prince-elector's capital in Dresden, Germany). Sieniawska, who competed with the king in architectural foundations, choose an old Royal edifice – the Visitationist Church established by Queen Marie Louise Gonzaga, as her major propaganda investment in the capital. Probably the most important was its location at the Cracow Suburb Street, in front of the main entrance to the new royal residence, so everyone who visited the king must pass before the ornate Sieniawska's magnum opus. She appointed her court architect Karol Bay to design a new rococo facade profusely embellished with columns and sculptures.

The conservation and enlargement of the former residence of Victorious King, John III Sobieski, is considered as her most significant achievement in the field of architecture. She embellished the palace facades and garden parterres with her coat of arms Szreniawa and monograms. For the decoration of the palace's interiors she nominated an Italian fresco painter Giuseppe Rossi, who adorned the chambers with trompe-l'œil paintings and mythological plafonds. By taking the example of Queen Marie Casimire, that ordered to paint her as a goddess in palace plafonds, the hetmaness decorated the Lower Vestibule with a fresco depicting her as a Roman goddess of fertility – Flora (she was almost 60 at that time).

In 1729, she erected the mausoleum in Berezhany to commemorate her husband, the last male line descendant of the Sieniawski family, but she did not complete the interior. Elżbieta Sieniawska died the same year in Oleszyce.

== Ancestors ==
Ancestors of Elżbieta Helena Sieniawska

16. Sebastian Lubomirski
8. Stanisław Lubomirski
17. Anna Branicka
4. Jerzy Sebastian Lubomirski
18. Aleksander Ostrogski
9. Zofia Ostrogska
19. Anna Kostka
2. Stanisław Herakliusz Lubomirski
20. Mikołaj Ligęza
10. Mikołaj Spytek Ligęza
21. Elżbieta Jordanówna
5. Konstancja Ligęza
22. Stanisław Krasiński
11. Zofia Krasińska
23. Anna Michowska
1. Elżbieta Sieniawska
24. Jan Opaliński
12. Piotr Opaliński
25. Barbara z Ostroroga Lwowska
6. Łukasz Opaliński
26. Krzysztof Kostka
13. Zofia Kostka
27. Anna Pilecka
3. Zofia Opalińska
28. Andrzej Tęczyński
14. Jan Tęczyński
29. Zofia Dembowska
7. Izabela Tęczyńska
30. Stanisław Miński
15. Dorota Mińska
31. Urszula Dembińska

== See also ==
- Marina Mniszech
- Urszula Mayerin
- Izabela Czartoryska
