= Stanisław Herakliusz Lubomirski =

Polish noble and politician (1642–1702)

Prince Stanisław Herakliusz Lubomirski
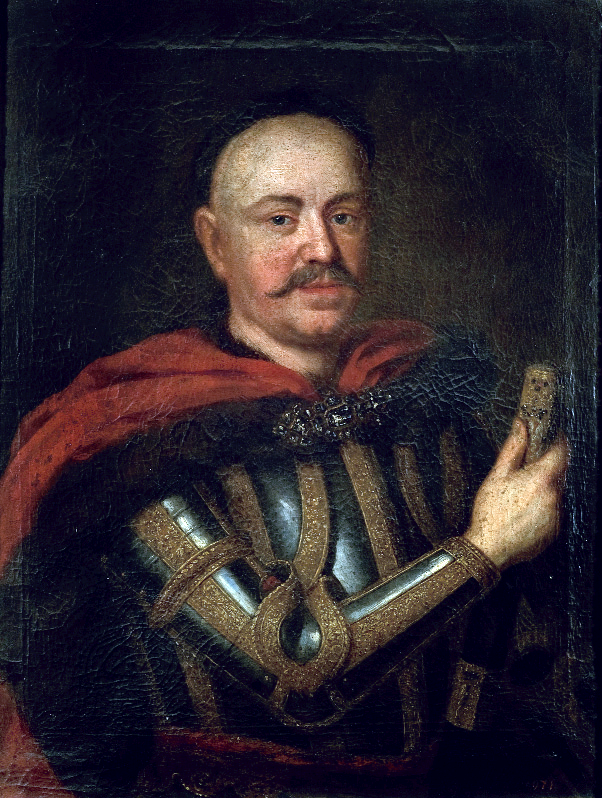
- Stanislaw Herakliusz Lubomirski
- Coat of arms: Lubomirski
- Born: 4 March 1642; Niepołomice or Wiśnicz
- Died: 17 January 1702 (aged 59); Jazdów (Warsaw)
- Noble family: Lubomirski
- Consorts: Zofia Opalińska; Elżbieta Doenhoff
- Father: Jerzy Sebastian Lubomirski
- Mother: Konstancja Ligęza

Prince Stanisław Herakliusz Lubomirski a.k.a. "Mirobulius Tassalinus" (4 March 1642 – 17 January 1702) was a Polish noble, politician, patron of the arts and writer.

== Early life ==
Prince Lubomirski was the son of Marshal and Hetman Prince Jerzy Sebastian Lubomirski and Konstancja Ligęza (died 1648). His paternal grandparents were Prince Stanisław Lubomirski and Zofia Ostrogska.

== Career ==
He was Podstoli of the Crown from 1669, Court Marshal of the Crown from 1673, Grand Marshal of the Crown from 1676 and starost of Spisz.

Lubomirski fought in wars against Sweden and Hungary. He participated with his father in the siege of Toruń in 1658. He refused to join the rokosz of his father and try to mediate between the rokoszans and the king.

He was a proponent of the vivente rege elections and supporter of the politics of queen Ludwika Maria. He performed numerous diplomatic missions to France, Italy and Spain. He was against the abdication of king Jan II Kazimierz in 1668. From 1667 he was frequently deputy for the Sejm. Owing to his experience and authority, the Sejm session in 1670 was not broken like the two sessions before, which were aborted by a veto. During the interregnum from 1673 to 1674, he supported the candidature of his friend, Jan Sobieski for the Polish throne. As Sejm Marshal he led the Election Sejm from 2 May to 19 June 1669 and the ordinary Sejm from 9 September to 31 October 1670 in Warsaw. In contrast to his father, he was free of private ambitions and always acted according to the interests of the Republic.

=== Other interests ===
He was variously talented. He became famous outside of Poland as the author of literary and scientific works. He wrote poems, plays and philosophical, religious and historical tracts. He was the founder and benefactor of schools and churches.

== Personal life ==
In 1669, he was married to Zofia Opalińska, the daughter of Court Marshal Łukasz Opaliński. Before her death, they were the parents of one child:

- Princess Elżbieta Lubomirska (1669–1729), who married Hetman Adam Mikołaj Sieniawski.

After the death of his first wife, he married Elżbieta Donhoff in 1676. She was the daughter of Teodor Denhoff, the Grand Chamberlain of the Crown, and Katarzyna Franciszka von Bessen, mistress of king John II Casimir Vasa. Her brother was Cardinal Jan Kazimierz Denhoff. Together, they were the parents of:

- Prince Józef Lubomirski (c. 1676–1732), who became voivode; he married Katarzyna Bełżecka and Teresa Mniszech.
- Prince Franciszek Lubomirski (d. 1721), who became General of the Crown Army.
- Prince Teodor Lubomirski (1683–1745), who became starost, voivode and Sejm Marshal; he married Elizabeth Mariana "Elżbieta" (née Culler-Cuming) Kristicz in 1721.

Prince Ludomirski died at Jazdów (Warsaw) on 17 January 1702.

== Works ==
- Poezje postu Świętego (including Sonnet on the Great Suffering of Jesus Christ)
- Tobiasz wyzwolony, Ecclesiastes
- Ermida (sielanka)
- Rozmowy Artaksesa i Ewandra (1683)
- De vanitate consiliorum (1700)
- De remediis animi humani (1701)
- Genii veredici
