= Lubomirski =

Polish noble family

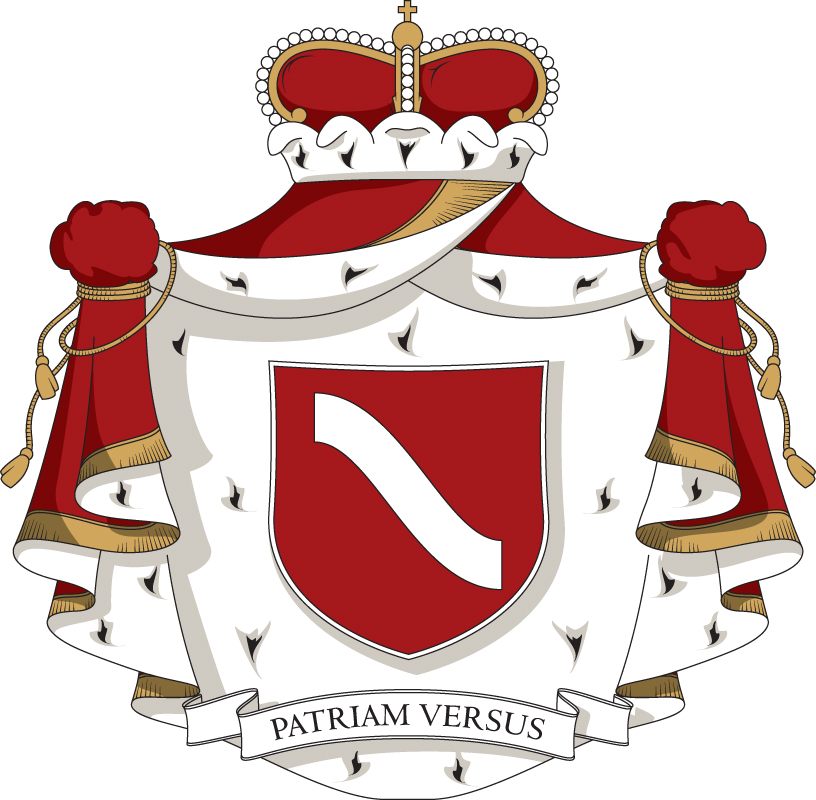
- Princely coat of arms of the Lubomirski family
- Current region: Poland
- Origin: Lesser Poland
- Estates: Lubomirski Palace, Warsaw; Lubomirski Palace, Lviv; Łańcut Castle; Presidential Palace, Warsaw

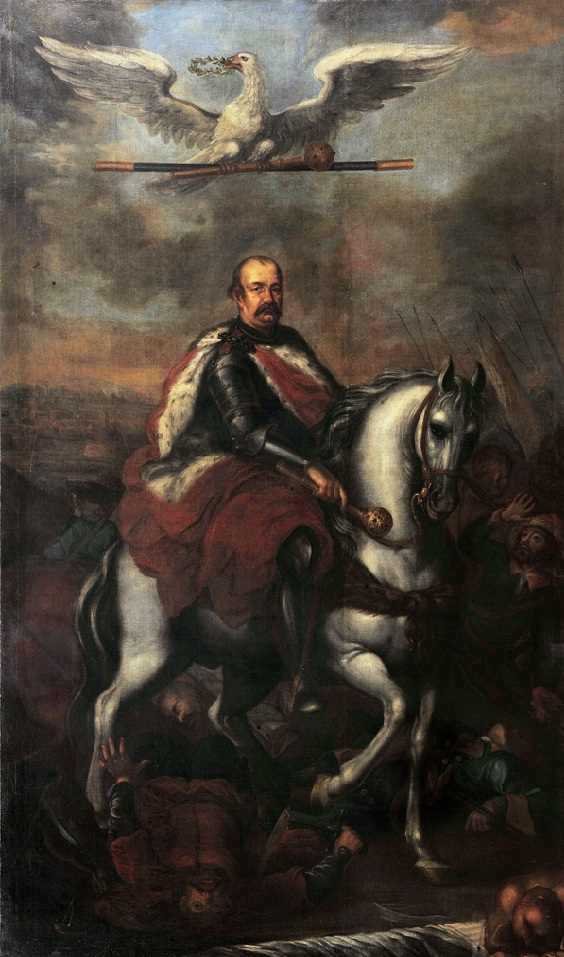
Prince Jerzy Sebastian Lubomirski

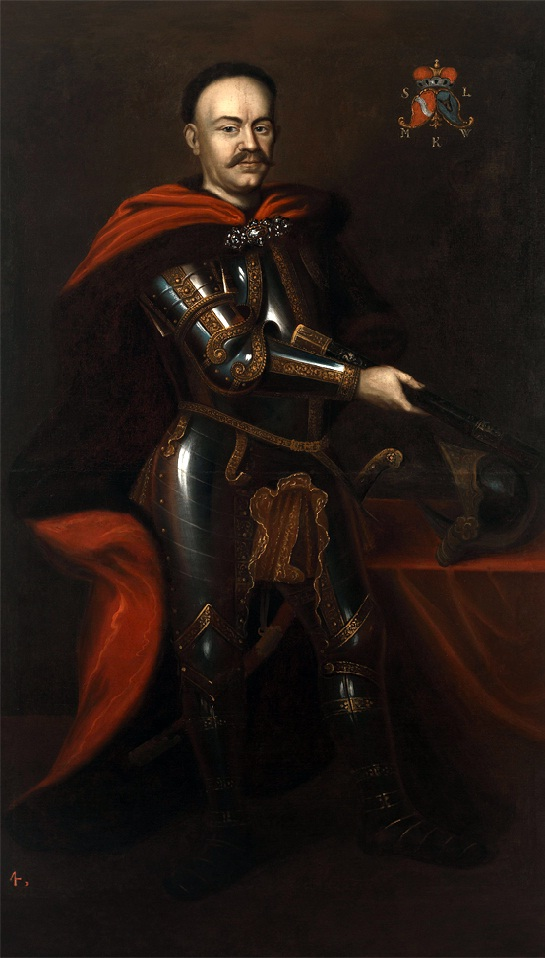
Prince Stanisław Herakliusz Lubomirski

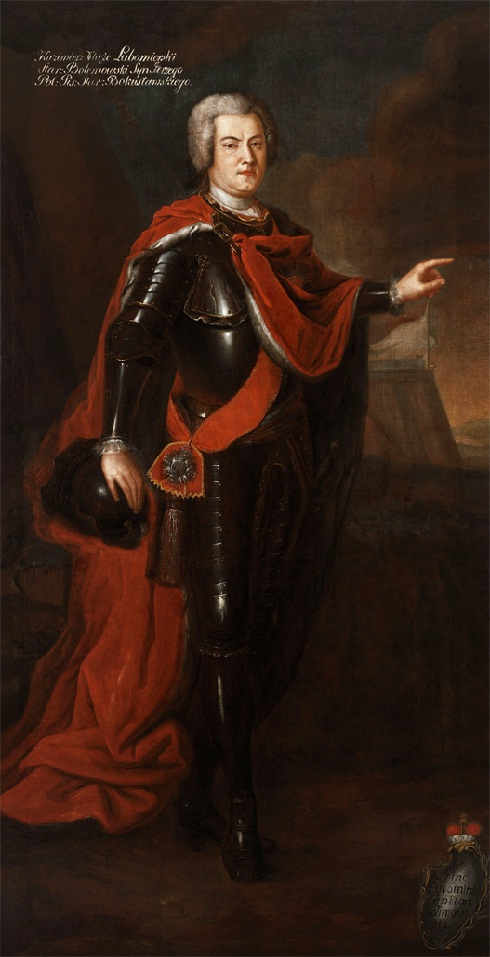
Prince Jan Kazimierz Lubomirski

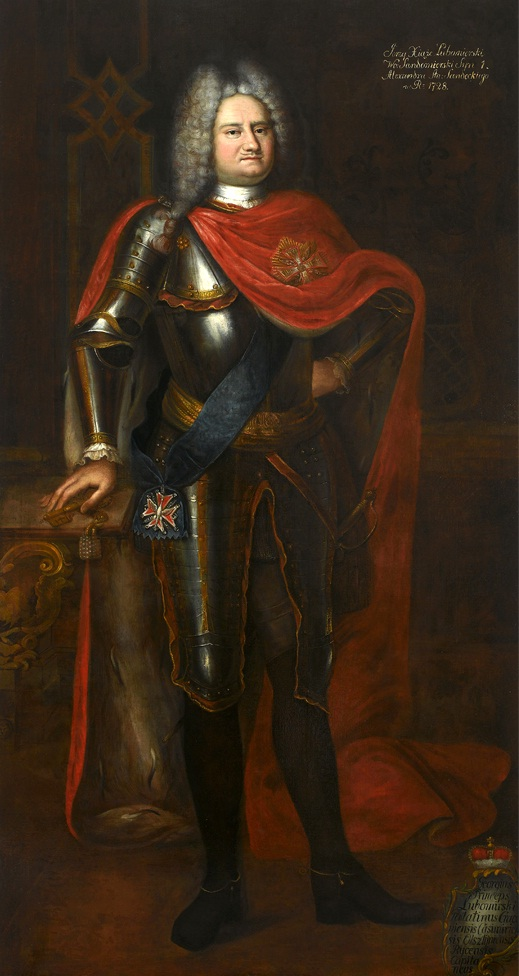
Prince Jerzy Aleksander Lubomirski

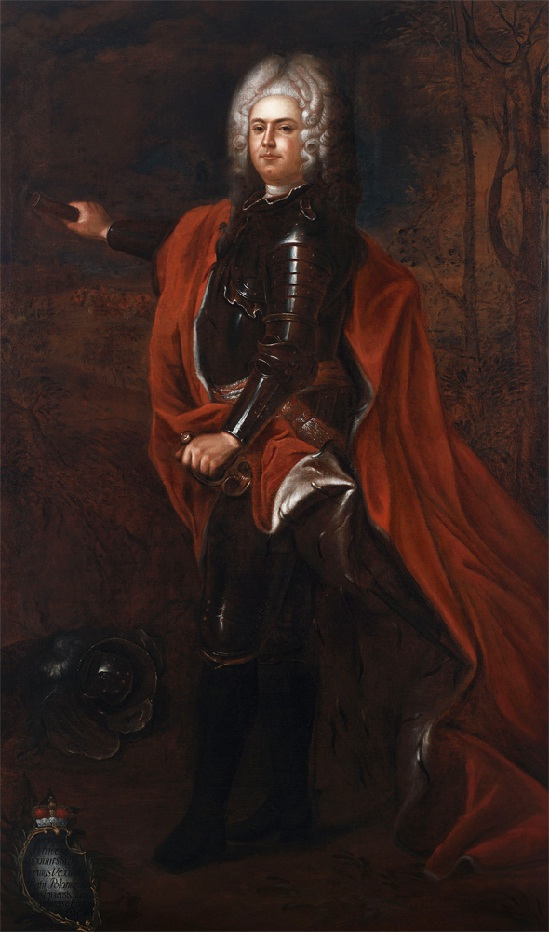
Prince Jerzy Ignacy Lubomirski

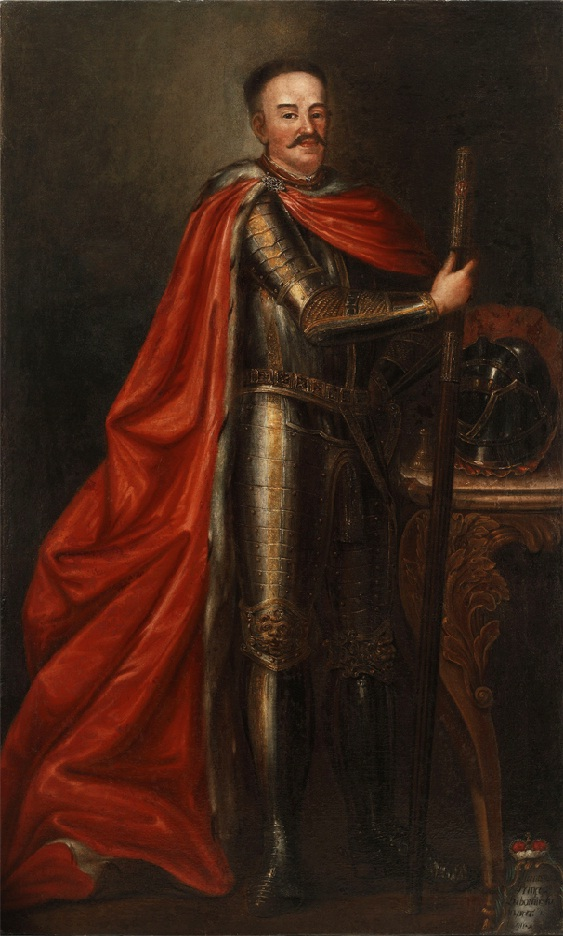
Prince Stanisław Herakliusz Lubomirski

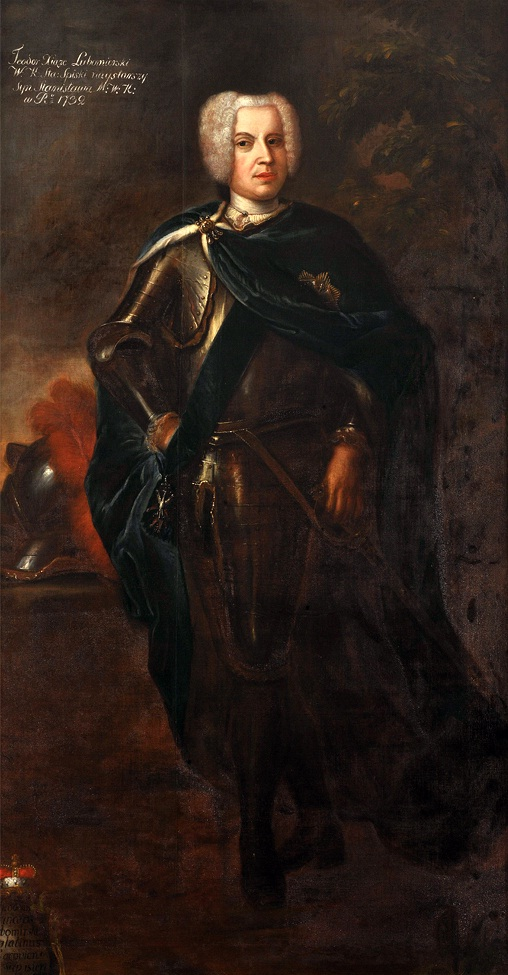
Prince Teodor Lubomirski

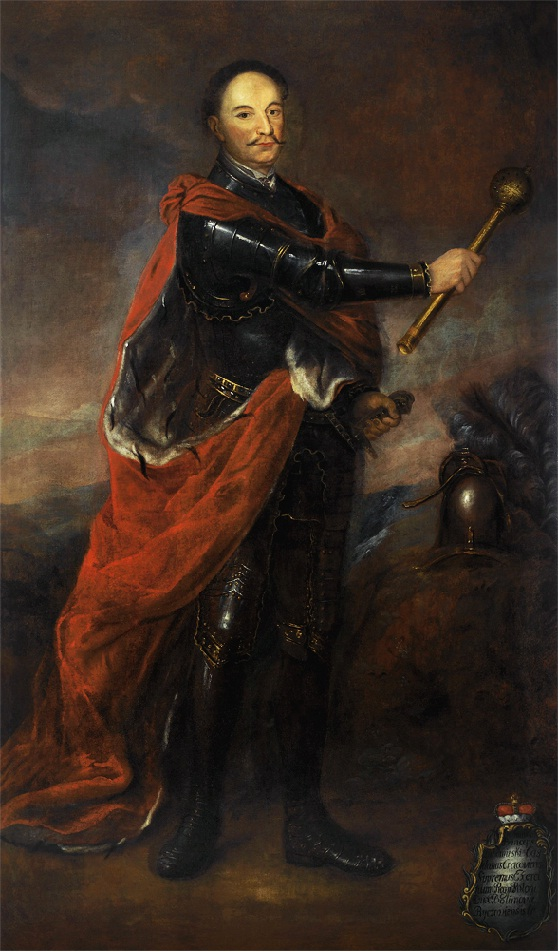
Prince Hieronim Augustyn Lubomirski

The House of Lubomirski is a Polish princely family. The Lubomirski family's coat of arms is the Drużyna coat of arms, which is similar to the Szreniawa coat of arms but without a cross.

== Origin and the coat of arms ==
The Lubomirski family have been actors in the history of Poland since the 10th century. There are two theories regarding the family's origin. One, by Adam Boniecki, a Polish heraldist, assumes that there were two branches of the family. One settled at the Szreniawa River in Proszowice County while the other established itself in Szczyrzyc County. The time of this division of the family is not known, but most likely it was before the adoption of Christianity by Poland. The Szreniawici family used a similar coat of arms, which means that the two families had the same ancestry. At the time of Mieszko I, the members of the Lubomirski family demonstrated bravery in battle against pagans. For this they were awarded the rank of knight and a coat of arms, which depicts bends of the Szreniawa River in the form of a letter S of white colour on a red background, instead of the Szreniawici cross, with the motto Patriam Versus (Turned to the Homeland). This coat of arms has been used by the representatives of the family to the present time.

The author of the second theory of the family's origins is the medievalist Władysław Semkowicz. In his article "The fellowship and Śreniawa. Heraldic study" („Drużyna i Śreniawa. Studyum heraldyczne”) he writes that the family used to live on the banks of the Szreniawa River in Szczyrzycki poviat (county), in the area surrounded by the Raba and Stradomka rivers, the Trzciański brook, and the Łososina and Krzyworzeka streams. Semkowicz says that the original territory of the Drużynnici family (ancestors of the Lubomirski, Wieruski, Rupniewski, and Lasocki families) was located there. Semkowicz says that the coat of arms does not show bends of a river, but a curved rod – a sign of episcopal or secular power, signifying that for many centuries before the adoption of the name, the family had exercised significant power. This theory assumes, in its later part, that, in the 15th century, the Polish chronicler Jan Długosz incorrectly ascribed the origin of the coat of arms of the fellowship (Szreniawa without a cross), and other heraldists accepted this view.

The history of the Szreniawici, or Drużynnici, family is closely linked with the rulers of the Piast dynasty. One of the Szreniawici was a canon at the Wawel court, and people using this coat of arms belonged to the inner circle of Bolesław II the Generous, according to Jan Długosz, in Annals or Chronicles of the Famous Kingdom of Poland (Roczniki czyli Kronikisławnego Królestwa Polskiego). The oldest document mentioning the Lubomirski family comes from the 11th century. It is in the property section of the Crown Register of 1682 in Kraków. The original no longer exists. There is only a mention in the register under a given year. Successive members of the family took up positions of bishops, for example, Piotr, Archbishop of Gniezno mediated between the princes of the Piast dynasty during the congress in Łęczyca in 1180. The family performed important functions at the court of the Piast dynasty and extended their estates through investing in land, mainly within the territory of the Małopolska province. Jakub Lubomirski served as a borough writer in the 14th century.

== Foundations of economic power ==
Piotr (d. 1480), the heir of Lubomierz, the territorial designation that is the basis of the family name, is regarded as the progenitor of the Lubomirski family. The economic foundation of the family rested on the exploitation of salt mines in Kraków province, the mineshafts being leased from rulers of Poland. The Lubomirski family also established private mines in Małopolska province. Sebastian (c. 1546 – 1613), who in 1581 became a mine administrator of Kraków, was the creator of this economic power. This was the first administrative position in the capital city occupied by a member of the family. While taking up his duties, Sebastian had the support of Stefan Batory. In 1595, Sebastian received the title of Count of Wiśnicz from the Emperor Rudolf II; in 1591, he entered the Senate as governor of Małogoszcz. He opened a private salt mine shaft "Kunegunda" in Siercza, which was exploited for about 100 years.

Money gained from the salt trade allowed the Lubomirski family to lend money to even the wealthiest people in the country. This enabled them to purchase properties or take them over from insolvent debtors. The family built up its economic position over many generations, accumulating assets that they held for centuries.

== Residences ==
The first mentions of the home in Lubomierz were recorded in 1398. The number of family estates, starting with Gdów and Szczyrzyca which the family also possessed in the 13th century, increased significantly. In the 17th and 18th centuries they were located in Lubomierz, Nowy Wiśnicz, Bochnia, Wieliczka, Łańcut, Baranów Sandomierski, Puławy, Rzeszów, Równe, Tarnów, Jarosław, Przeworsk, and Janowiec upon the Vistula, among others. To this day, the castle in Nowy Wiśnicz has been the property of the Family Association of the Princes Lubomirski. Many estates were located in the territories of the largest Polish cities: Warsaw (e.g. Mokotów, Ujazdów, Czerniaków), Kraków (Wola Justowska, Kamienica Pod Baranami), Rzeszów (castle), Sandomierz, and Lviv (then Lwów). Maintaining foreign residences in Dresden, Vienna, and Paris enhanced family prestige. The members of the family were referred to as "the owners of the bank of the Dnieper River" because many of their estates were located in what is now Ukraine and Slovakia. The Lubomirski family enjoyed political, military, and economic influence, which was concentrated in the provinces of Kraków, Sandomierz, Stanisławów, and Ruthenia, to eventually cover the whole area of the Polish–Lithuanian Commonwealth. They kept this state of ownership until the collapse of the Polish state, when they were deprived of many estates as a result of penalties for pro-independence activities.

The Lubomirski family looked to invest by buying large estate complexes. They consciously strived to gather them into one contiguous whole. Territorial expansion began in the ancestral territory located south of Kraków and was directed toward the east. The combined estates reached their largest size at the time of Stanisław (d. 1649). It was the third largest holding in the Republic of Poland, only smaller than the entail of Ostróg and the estates of the Radziwiłł family. In addition to purchasing properties, the Lubomirski family leased rich royal estates, such as the Starosties of Spisz, Sandomierz, and Sącz. Income from the land leased from the king was comparable to that from private estates.

The family introduced several innovative facilities and processes to their estates. Their arable farms adopted methods of industrial production; sugar factories, distilleries, and factories were built. They also introduced enlightened social practices, such as granting equal rights for subjects, allowing Jews to buy properties in private towns and to build houses, and vesting them with judicial powers. Jerzy Sebastian was particularly involved in the activities of democratization. He believed that the increase in economic rights of all his subjects would make him get richer, too. Schools and hospitals for the peasant population were founded, which were maintained with private family income. The family estates often hired people from the lowest class, caring about their education, offering a place of residence, clothing, and a salary paid twice a year. For faithful service, workers were given ownership of land in perpetual or inheritable possession.

== Division ==
The family, originally small in number, grew considerably, which led to divisions of material wealth but enhanced political influence, due to having the support of more people in the Sejms, in the Senate, or at the royal court. Members of the family were able to count on the support of their relatives in political or court activities.

The family split into five major lineages: of Wiśnicz (from Aleksander Michał, 1614 – 1677), Łańcut (from Stanisław Herakliusz, 1642 – 1702), Przeworsk (from Aleksander Michał, – d. 1675), Rzeszów (from Hieronim Augustyn, c. 1647 – 1706), and Janowiec (from Jerzy Dominik, 1665 – 1727). The most numerous was that of Przeworsk, which was further divided into three branches: dubrowieńsko-kruszyńska, równieńsko-przeworska, and dubieńska. Many members of this line are alive now.

== First citizens of Poland ==
The members of the family served the state as marshals, starosts, governors, and hetmans. Four of the princes Lubomirski held the office of Grand Marshal of the Crown: Jerzy Sebastian, Józef Karol, Stanisław Herakliusz and Stanisław. They were active in the politics, chairing the Sejms, forming a private army, representing the king at the courts Europe. Many times they had a decisive influence on the choice of monarchs. They were defenders of the nobility, who often entrusted the family with their proxy vote at the Sejms and in the election of kings. Although Jerzy Sebastian was Grand Marshal and Field Hetman of the Crown, he supported the nobility in rebellion.

Marriages were also important. Members of the Lubomirski family became linked with equally powerful and wealthy families. It enabled them to extend their private estates, and even take over a part of the estate of Ostróg under the Kolbuszowa transaction of 1753. Stanisław Lubomirski (1583 – 1649) married Zofia Ostrogska; Aleksander Michał Lubomirski married Helena Tekla Ossolińska; Krystyna Lubomirska married Albrycht Stanisław Radziwiłł. Józef Karol (1638 – 1702) was Teofilia Ludwika Zasławska’s husband; Teresa Lubomirska (d. 1712) married Karol Filip, the Prince of Neuburg, and Marianna Lubomirska (1693 – 1729) married Paweł Karol Sanguszko, the Grand Marshal of Lithuania.

== Royal blood ==
In 1647, Stanisław Lubomirski received the hereditary title of Prince of the Holy Roman Empire from Emperor Ferdinand III. The Lubomirski family itself was a candidate for Poland's crown. Grand Hetman of the Crown Prince Hieronim Augustyn was the most serious candidate for the Polish crown after the death of John III Sobieski. Prince Teodor Konstanty (1683–1745), governor of Kraków, submitted his candidacy for the Crown after the death of Augustus II the Strong. Prince Stanisław Lubomirski, governor of Kiev and Speaker of the Radom treasury tribunal, campaigned for the throne in 1764. Lubomirski princes were also candidates for the Czech and Hungarian crowns; Jerzy Ignacy Lubomirski (1687–1753) sought the throne of Hungary. The culmination of these efforts was Zdzislaw Lubomirski's serving as prince regent from 1917 to 1918.

The Lubomirski family was related to almost all the dynasties ruling in Europe, the Capetien, Bourbon, Liudolfing, Wittelsbach, Hohenzollern, and Rurykowicz dynasties. The family is maternally related to the Piast of Masovia family. Zofia Lubomirska was the great-granddaughter of Anna Lubomirska, the daughter of Konrad III Rudy, the prince of Mazovia. Katarzyna Lubomirska (c. 1585 – 1620) was the wife of Konstanty Bazyli II, Prince of Ostróg, who was closely related to Bolesław IV, a descendant of Konrad Mazowiecki.

A descendant of the House of Lubomirski, reportedly Ladislas Jean Lubomirski (father of the photographer Alexi Lubomirski), tested at Family TreeDNA. He belongs to Y-haplogroup J2b-L283 > PH1602.

== Military exploits ==
Prince Stanisław Lubomirski was famous for commanding at the Battle of Chocim in 1621, fought against Turkish-Tatar forces. Stanisław initially took part in the battle at the head of a private regiment, but when hetman Karol Chodkiewicz died, and hetman Koniecpolski was taken captive, Stanisław took command and ended the multi-day battle quickly, with the Turks being repelled on October 10, 1621.

Prince Jerzy Sebastian Lubomirski (1616 – 1667) was the only Polish aristocrat during the Deluge to not take the oath to Charles X Gustav. Jerzy gave shelter to king John II Casimir on his estate in Lubowla (today's Slovakia) and launched a counteroffensive of Polish troops. He lent his private army, which fought the Battle of Warka, and recaptured Warsaw and Toruń, which had been occupied by the Swedes. Stefan Czarniecki supported the campaign. In 1660, at the head of private and royal armies, Prince Jerzy Sebastian Lubomirski conducted a lightning campaign that ended with the defeat of Russian forces at Cudnów and Połonka. In 1661, a worsening of relations with the king resulted in rebellion. The prince withdrew to Silesia; and, degraded by the Sejm court, fought for his political rehabilitation. His sons succeeded in this matter.

Prince Hieronim Augustyn, a member of the Order of Hospitallers, devoted his life to fighting the Ottoman Turks, who were considered a cultural threat to European civilization. He also defeated Ukrainian commander Petro Doroshenko in a Cossack Uprising against Poland. In 1670, he fought against the Crimean Horde at Bracław and Kalnik. In 1683, during the Battle of Vienna, his troops were the first to reach the city gates. Under the Polish–Lithuanian Commonwealth, eight members of the family served as generals. Two of them took part in the war with the Russian Empire, which gave rise to the Kościuszko Insurrection.

== Lubomirski family in the history of Warsaw ==
To build his numerous residences, Prince Stanisław Herakliusz Lubomirski (1642 – 1702) hired Tylman of Gameren, later court architect to King Michał Korybut Wiśniowiecki. Stanisław Lubomirski owned residences in Puławy, Czerniaków, (where he founded a monastery and church of the Bernardines), and in Ujazdów (now part of Warsaw), where, at the end of the 17th century, he built a bathhouse that became the Palace on the Water of Stanisław August Poniatowski, and the Ermitage, which was planned as a place of meditation and relaxation. Stanisław Herakliusz was a friend of many European artists and patrons of the arts, as evidenced by his correspondence. He had relations with the French and Spanish courts, as well as members of the Medici family. These facilitated his carrying out a number of missions and negotiations on behalf of the Polish king.

Stanisław Herakliusz was a talented author, a precursor of the Polish Baroque in literature. He spoke several languages and made use of almost all known literary forms in his works. However, he was interested mostly in the new trends coming from Italy. His philosophical work "Dialogues of Artakses and Ewander" entered the canon of the Old Polish Literature and became required reading.

An example of building in the very centre of Warsaw is a reconstruction of the Copper-Roof Palace (Pałac Pod Blachą), commissioned in the early 18th century by Jerzy Dominik Lubomirski. The palace, classical in form and situated on the south side of the Royal Castle, was bought by the king himself, in 1777, who later added the library.

The previous owner of this building was Prince Jerzy Marcin Lubomirski (1738 – 1811), distinguished in service to the Polish theatre. He financed exhibitions of family and European art and organized numerous concerts, balls, and meetings. Celebrations organized by him were a meeting place for artists and aristocrats from across Europe, while in local memory he was remembered as an organizer of public events with fireworks displays.

Prince Jerzy Marcin was also an adventurer and a member of the Bar Confederation. From 1758, he served in the Prussian and Russian armies. He was barred from political life in Poland by his family, but he went down in history as a lover of music and theatre. In 1777, he financed a production of Tartuffe by Molière; in 1783 leased the privilege of the theatre and made Wojciech Bogusławski its director. He also opened a ballet drama school for 1000 people.

Prince Stanisław Lubomirski went down in history as an administrator of Warsaw. He introduced permanent street lighting and supported a police unit with his private money. Above all, he wished to care for the health of the Varsovians, wherefore he decided to surround the city, on both sides of the Vistula, with an earthen embankment, initially to protect against the spreading plague epidemic. There were only three crossings in the embankment, by which traffic in and out of the city was controlled. Later, the embankment, reinforced with guns, was used to defend the capital during the Kościuszko Uprising and the November Uprising. Throughout the 19th century, the embankment marked the boundary of the city. By the Act of 1770, Stanisław introduced permanent street names, which greatly facilitated the administration of the city and its functioning, especially facilitating registration and correspondence.

Princess Izabela Lubomirska (1736 – 1816), the wife of Stanisław, rebuilt the Łańcut Castle and collected art and books from around the world. She was politically active; during the revolution, she sheltered part of the French court at her estate in Łańcut. She extended her residences, often employing the latest architectural solutions. She built a palace on her estate in Mokotów, the district of Warsaw that gets its name from her estate, Mon Coteau (My Hill). She was a lover of theatre and laid the foundation stone of the National Theatre in Warsaw, as well as maintaining a number of theatres in her palaces. The notion of theatre then had a much broader meaning than now. It included not only the theatre performances, but also opera, cabaret, and acrobatic performances. For her, Franciszek Karpiński wrote the "Song about the Lord’s birth", better known under the title "God is born". In honour of her daughter, Cyprian Kamil Norwid wrote a panegyric. Tadeusz Kościuszko set out from the residence in Łańcut, to Kraków, when he incited the Kościuszko Uprising.

They also bore the title of Count of Wisnicz und Jaroslaw.

== Philanthropists and patrons ==
The Lubomirski family, like other affluent aristocratic families, engaged in artistic, cultural, and scientific patronage. At Wiśnicz, Wilanów, the Royal Baths, Łańcut, or Mokotów, they supported private theatre groups, financed artists, funded religious buildings, and maintained their residences. The reconstruction of Wiśnicz castle was planned by architect Maciej Trapola, the castle chapel being decorated with stucco by Giovanni Battista Falconi and wherein Stanisław Lubomirski, who financed the renovation of the castle, installed twenty sacred objects.

Marceli Lubomirski for many years supported the work of poet Cyprian Kamil Norwid. He was immortalized by the poet in the book White Flowers. Józef Lubomirski (1751 – 1817) was a promoter of industrialization and reforms, a capable military commander, and a knight of the Order of White Eagle and the Order of Saint Stanislaus. He supported the Constitution of May 3, 1791.

The Lubomirski family built private schools for pupils on their estates. They often put schooling in the hands of professionals – the Order of Piarists and the Order of Jesuits. The members of the family founded monasteries, churches, and other religious buildings. Stanisław Lubomirski founded the Carmelite Monastery in Wiśnicz, which is still the pearl of Renaissance architecture in Poland. For many decades, residents of the castle in Wiśnicz contributed various legacies to the monastery. Jerzy Dominik Lubomirski (c. 1665 – 1727) gave to the Pauline Monastery at Jasna Góra many valuable objects, including the sacred vessels. It was on his initiative to build the main gate leading to the Monastery. The gate is called the Gate of the Lubomirski Family.

== Under partition ==
After 1795, the princes Lubomirski engaged in clandestine and insurgent activities against the occupying Russians; and, in consequence, they lost estates. Prince Jerzy Roman Lubomirski (1799 – 1865), the owner of Rozwadów, participated in the battles of the November and January uprisings and organized hospitals for the wounded on his estates. After the collapse of the uprising, his palace became a place where secret meetings of Polish patriots were held. Jerzy was active in social and scientific fields, maintaining a grammar school and poorhouse for the poor and establishing two scientific foundations, one funding the scientific testing of equipment, the other rewarding Polish authors of outstanding scientific works. His brother Adam Hieronim Karol Lubomirski (1811 – 1873) was awarded the Virtuti Militari cross, for participating in the November Uprising.

In 1883, Prince Henryk Lubomirski (1777–1850) gave his rich collection of books, archive material, works of art, and other antiques to the Ossoliński National Institute in Lvov, which since has become an important scientific and cultural institution, with its 19th-century publications, on the humanities research conducted there, being still considered of value. Without the material and financial support of Henryk, the facility would have closed at an early stage of activity. Henryk for many years served as a curator of the facility. He also contributed to the formation of the Museum of the Princes Lubomirski, the first private museum in the Polish land generally available to the public. He was on familiar terms with poet Zygmunt Krasiński, who memorialized the prince in his Non-Divine Comedy, in the person of Orcio. In 1823, Henryk created the entail of Przeworsk; but, as a result of his subversive activities, the entail was legalized by the partitioning authorities only after his death. In 1869, his son Prince Andrzej Lubomirski became the first recognized entailer.

Prince Aleksander Lubomirski (1802 - 1893) founded centres for poor boys (at today's seat of the University of Economics) and girls (in Łagiewniki) in the centre of Kraków. At these centres, young poor were prepared for adult life, being instructed for free in practical professions that could be the basis for future employment.

Prince Jan Tadeusz Lubomirski (1826 – 1908) founded the Warsaw Charity Society. He was the long-standing president of the Ophthalmology Institute in Warsaw, which conducted ophthalmology research according to European standards. On his initiative, special teams were set up which helped poor people to get free eye care. During the January Uprising the prince was a member of the National Government of Romuald Traugutt, where he served as a head of the Department of Internal Affairs. For anti-Tsarist activities, he was exiled deep into Russia, to Nizhny Novgorod. He supported Polish education. He protected Polish vocational organizations from competition from Russian and Prussian ones and established credit unions. He tried to regain possession of Polish art stolen by the Russians; and among others, he helped to reconstruct the Poniatowski monument standing in front of the Presidential Palace. He also restored and renovated the Zygmunt's Column, and bought Polish castles in Czersk and Iłża, in order to save them from being demolished. In 1875, he established the Museum of Industry and Agriculture in Warsaw. He established evening schools for craftsmen and journeymen as well as penny-saving banks for the poor. He financed the publishing of sources important in the history of Poland, as well as professional magazines. He organized free libraries.

Władysław Emanuel Lubomirski supported the Zoological Cabinet of the University of Warsaw, helping to purchase teaching aids and financing travel by employees of the university. He donated his collection of shells. He was interested in floristics and studied the behavior of plants in the changed climate conditions. The Zoological Museum of the Institute of Zoology of the Polish Academy of Sciences (PAN) has been making use of his collections to this day.

Prince Władysław Lubomirski (1866 – 1934) was a patron and founder of Music Young Poland. To facilitate the operation of the organization, he founded a company that promoted talented young Polish artists. He supported music education. He helped to promote Karol Szymanowski, Artur Rubinstein, and Grzegorz Fitelberg. He helped to protect the Warsaw Philharmonic from closure by Tsarist officials. Władysław and Jan Tadeusz Lubomirski were important in creating the Family Association of the Princes Lubomirski.

Prince Stanisław Sebastian Lubomirski (1875 – 1932) founded the Warsaw aviation association Aviata in 1910. His aim was to establish the first civilian pilot school and aircraft factory on Polish soil. The first airport of Aviata was located at Mokotów Field, with the permission of Tsarist officials.

== Independent Poland ==
On 7 of October 1918, after 123 years under the third partition, on the initiative of Prince Regent Zdzisław Lubomirski (1865 – 1943), Polish independence was proclaimed and published in the Monitor Polski. Zdzisław was a politician, president of the Civic Committee, and the president of Warsaw. He extended self-government, organized intervention works, credit unions, and cared for the education and living conditions of the Varsovians. His activities mapped out the direction that future politicians of the independent state would follow. In 1926, he undertook the role of mediator between the parties to the May coup. In the 1930s, he was a senator on the foreign affairs and military committees. During World War II he was imprisoned and tortured by the Gestapo. He died of wounds sustained in prison.

== Interwar period ==
In the years 1919 – 1939, princes Lubomirski served as Members of Parliament, senators, and in the ministries. They were also engaged in the industrialization of the country. They belonged to the key organizations involved in the modernization of roads, railways, and aviation. They took part in the reconstruction of the Polish army. They formed banking centres and credit unions, which provided cheap loans to the poorest, and were active in educational organizations, financing schools, as well as being engaged in Polish culture.

Prince Stefan Lubomirski (1862 – 1941) was a founder of the Polish Olympic Games Committee (later the Polish Olympic committee, PKOL), becoming its first president (its next president being his cousin, Prince Kazimierz Lubomirski), and a member of the International Olympic Committee. Prince Stefan was passionate about racehorse breeding, forming with his brothers the most modern horse-breeding farm in Poland at Widzów manor near Częstochowa. Stefan was the owner of the Warsaw Commuter Railways (Warszawska Kolej Dojazdowa) company, which created the narrow gauge passenger and freight railways of Grójec, Jabłonków, and Wilanów. Railways allowed capital city dwellers to reach factories located outside the city and residents of suburban areas to get to the capital city. During World War II, the railways built by Lubomirski delivered supplies to the occupied city and brought employees to Warsaw offices and factories.

Prince Stanisław Sebastian Lubomirski established the central union of Polish industry Leviatan, where he was the president from 1932. The union promoted the ideas of development of industry – lowering taxes, social security benefits for workers, and increasing state aid to industry. Members of the organization were elected to the Sejm, the Senate, were members of governments of the Second Republic of Poland, and served other state institutions. They published three magazines: Economic Review (Przegląd Gospodarczy), The Polish Courier (Kurier Polski), and The Telegram (Depesza). Stanisław Sebastian established the Industrial Bank of Warsaw SA (Bank Przemysłowy Warszawski S.A.) and was the president of the Commercial Bank (Bank Handlowy) in Warsaw, the Central Union of Polish Industry (Centralny Związek Przemysłu Polskiego), the Polish Bank Association (Związek Banków Polskich), and the Association of Polish Industrialists (Stowarzyszenie Przemysłowców Polskich). He devoted his life to the struggle for the independence of the Polish economy from the influence of the partitioners, and, after regaining independence, from that of neighbouring countries.

== World War II. Armed struggle ==
Prince Stefan Lubomirski (1898 – 1948) during the occupation was a member of the Western Union. For keeping a secret storehouse of medicines for the Home Army, he was arrested and detained in prison in Montelupich. He was on the list to be shot but escaped to Kraków, where he was hidden. The Germans set the date for the transportation of his family to the concentration camp near Oświęcim.

Prince Eugeniusz Lubomirski (1895 – 1982) was arrested by the NKVD and put in the Lubyanka Prison, where he met General Anders, later becoming the general's adjutant, fighting at the general's side throughout Europe. He eventually reached the United Kingdom and was a candidate for President of Poland in Exile.

Prince Hieronim Lubomirski was killed at the age of 17, during the rescue of prisoners in Pawiak code-named Action "Pawiak" ("Akcja Pawiak"). On July 19–20, 1944, a Ukrainian Wachmeister (guard) Petrenko, and some prisoners attempted a mass jailbreak, supported by an attack from the outside, but failed. Petrenko and several others committed suicide. The Resistance attack detachment was ambushed and suffered very heavy casualties, practically ceasing to exist. In reprisal, over 380 prisoners were executed the next day.

Prince Jerzy Ignacy Lubomirski (1882 – 1945) was active in the local community. He travelled to Vienna to discuss the construction of the bridge over the San River. He helped people particularly affected during the war. He was arrested in 1944 and detained and tortured in Tarnobrzeg prison. He was murdered by the Secret Police (Urząd Bezpieczeństwa) as a member of the Home Army.

== Recent times ==
In 2010, family members established the Princes Lubomirski Foundation (Fundacja Książąt Lubomirskich), to facilitate charitable activities. The foundation supports the development of various social and heritage projects in Poland. Jan Lubomirski-Lanckoroński is the current president of the foundation.

== Family members ==
- Aleksander Michał Lubomirski (1614–1677)
- Aleksander Michał Lubomirski (-1673)
- Aleksandra Lubomirska (1760–1836)
- Alexi Lubomirski (1975-)
- Anna Krystyna Lubomirska (1618–1667)
- Anna Krystyna Lubomirska (-1701)
- Anna Lubomirska (-1736)
- Anna Lubomirska (-1763)
- Antoni Benedykt Lubomirski (1718-1761)
- Antoni Lubomirski (1718–1782)
- Elżbieta Lubomirska (1755–1783)
- Elżbieta Lubomirska (1669-1729)
- Franciszek Ferdynant Lubomirski (1710–1747)
- Franciszek Lubomirski (-1721)
- Franciszek Sebastian Lubomirski (–1699)
- Henryk Ludwik Lubomirski (1777-1850)
- Hieronim Augustyn Lubomirski (1647–1706)
- Jan Kazimierz Lubomirski (1692-1737)
- Jerzy Aleksander Lubomirski (-1735)
- Jerzy Dominik Lubomirski (1654–1727)
- Jerzy Sebastian Lubomirski (1616–1667)
- Józef Karol Lubomirski (1638–1702)
- Józef Lubomirski (1676–1732)
- Julia Lubomirska (1764–1794)
- Katarzyna Lubomirska (-1611)
- Konstancja Malgorzata Lubomirska (1761–1840)
- Krystyna Lubomirska (-1645)
- Krystyna Lubomirska (-1699)
- Maria Karolina Lubomirska (1730–1795)
- Marianna Lubomirska (1693–1729)
- Sebastian Lubomirski (1539–1613)
- Stanisław Herakliusz Lubomirski (1642–1702)
- Stanisław Lubomirski (1583–1649)
- Stanisław Lubomirski (1704-1793)
- Stanisław Lubomirski (1722–1782)
- Teodor Lubomirski (1683–1745)
- Teresa Lubomirska (1658–1712)
- Władysław Jan Emanuel Lubomirski (1824–1882)
- Zofia Lubomirska (1718-1790)
- Kazimierz Lubomirski (1869–1930)

== Family tree ==
Lubomirski family tree

Aleksander Dominik Lubomirski; 1693-1720
Sebastian Lubomirski; 1546-1613; Anna Pieniążek; Anna Branicka	Stanisław Lubomirski; 1583-1649; Zofia Ostrogska	Aleksander Michał Lubomirski; 1614-1677; Helena Tekla Ossolińska	Józef Karol Lubomirski; 1638-1702; Teofila Ludwika Zasławska	Teresa Lubomirska; 1685-1712; Charles III Philip
Stanisław Lubomirski -1585; Laura de Effremis; Barbara Hruszowska	Katarzyna Lubomirska; Jan Przypkowski	Joachim Lubomirski; 1588-1610	Marianna Lubomirska; 1693-1729; Paweł Karol Sanguszko	Józefa Lubomirska; 1764-1851; Adam Walewski; Joseph de Witt
Anna Lubomirska; Wincenty Wieruski	Katarzyna Lubomirska -1611; Janusz Ostrogski	Jerzy Sebastian Lubomirski; 1616-1667; Konstancja Ligęza; Barbara Tarło	Stanisław Herakliusz Lubomirski; 1642-1702; Zofia Opalińska; Elżbieta Doenhoff	Elżbieta Lubomirska; 1669-1729; Adam Mikołaj Sieniawski	Kacper Lubomirski; 1724-1780; Barbara Lubomirska	Marianna Lubomirska; 1766-1810; Protazy Antoni Potocki; Walerian Zubow; Teodor Uwarow
Zofia Lubomirska; 1585-1612; Mikołaj Oleśnicki	Konstanty Jacek Lubomirski; 1620-1663; Barbara Domicella Szczawińska	Teodor Lubomirski; 1683-1745; Elżbieta Culler-Cuming	Anna Lubomirska; Mikołaj Esterhazy
Barbara Lubomirska; Jan Zebrzydowski	Konstancja Lubomirska; 1618-1646; Kazimierz Franciszek Czarnkowski	Franciszek Lubomirski -1721	Anna Lubomirska; 1717-1763; Wacław Rzewuski
Krystyna Lubomirska -1645; Stanisław Koniecpolski	Anna Krystyna Lubomirska; 1618-1667; Albrycht Stanisław Radziwiłł	Józef Lubomirski; 1676-1732; Katarzyna Bełżecka; Teresa Mniszech	Antoni Lubomirski; 1718-1782; Apolonia Ustrzycka; Zofia Krasińska	Elżbieta Lubomirska; 1755-1783; Roman Ignacy Potocki
Aleksander Michał Lubomirski -1675; Katarzyna Anna Sapieha	Anna Konstancja Lubomirska -1726; Jan Kazimierz Wielopolski; Stanisław Małachowski	Stanisław Lubomirski; 1722-1782; Elżbieta Czartoryska	Julia Lubomirska; 1764-1794; Jan Potocki
Jerzy Aleksander Lubomirski; 1666-1735; Joanna von Starzhausen; Aniela Teresa Michowska	Anna Lubomirska; Antoni Józef Dąmbski	Aleksandra Lubomirska; 1760-1836; Stanisław Kostka Potocki
Michał Lubomirski -1714	Józef Lubomirski -1755; Felicja Jabłonowska; Marianna Jabłonowska; Magdalena Agnieszka Lubomirska	Konstancja Małgorzata Lubomirska; 1761-1840; Seweryn Rzewuski
Józef Lubomirski -1710	Stanisław Lubomirski; 1704-1793; Ludwika Honorata Pociej	Ludwika Lubomirska -1829; Józef Makary Potocki	Eugeniusz Lubomirski; 1789-1834; Maria Czacka; Klementyna ks. Światopełk-Czetwertyńska	Jan Tadeusz Lubomirski; 1826-1908; Maria Zamoyska	Zdzisław Lubomirski; 1865-1943; Maria Branicka
Hieronim Augustyn Lubomirski; 1648-1706; Konstancja Bokum	Anna Lubomirska -1736; Franciszek Wielopolski	Ksawery Lubomirski; 1747–1819; Antonia Adela Potocka; Teofila Rzewuski; Maria Lvovna Naryshkina	Aleksander Ignacy Lubomirski; 1802-1893; Julia Radziwill
Marianna Lubomirska; Krzysztof Towiański	Józef Aleksander Lubomirski; 1751–1817; Ludwika Sosnowska	Henryk Ludwik Lubomirski; 1777-1850; Teresa Czartoryska	Dorota Lubomirska; 1807-1844
Elżbieta Lubomirska; Jakub Zygmunt Rybiński	Maria Karolina Lubomirska; 1730-1795; Karol Stanisław Radziwiłł	Izabela Maria Lubomirska; 1808-1868; Władysław Hieronim Sanguszko	Teresa Lubomirska; 1856-1883; Karol Radziwił
Krystyna Lubomirska -1669; Feliks Kazimierz Potocki	Jerzy Ignacy Lubomirski; 1687-1753; Magda Magdalena Bielińska; Joanna von Stein	Fryderyka Lubomirska; Roland Desalleurs mrgr. de Lirée	Jadwiga Julia Wanda Lubomirska; 1815-1895; Eugeniusz de Ligne	Elżbieta Lubomirska; 1858-1859
Franciszek Sebastian Lubomirski -1699	Jan Lubomirski -1736; Urszula Branicka	Karolina Lubomirska; Karol Flemming	Jerzy Henryk Lubomirski; 1817-1872; Cecylia Zamoyska; Laura Godefroid	Maria Lubomirska; 1860-1942; Benedykt Tyszkiewicz-Łohojski	Henryk Lubomirski; 1905-1986
Aleksander Lubomirski; 1695-1772; Karolina Fryderyka von Vitzthum	Ludwika Lubomirska; Fryderyk August Rutowski	Andrzej Lubomirski; 1862-1953; Eleonora Husarzewska	Cecylia Lubomirska; 1907-2001; Gabriel of Bourbon-Two Sicilies
Jerzy Dominik Lubomirski; 1654-1727; Ursula Katharina of Altenbockum; Magdalena Tarło	Antoni Benedykt Lubomirski; 1710-1761; Anna Zofia Ożarowska	Marcin Lubomirski; 1738-1811; Marianna Hadik de Futak; Honorata Stempkowska; Tekla Łabęcka	Antoni Lubomirski; 1770-1801	Kazimierz Lubomirski; 1869-1930; Teresa Wodzicka	Sebastian Lubomirski; 1908-
Anna Krystyna Lubomirska -1701; Dominik Mikołaj Radziwiłł; Franciszek Stefan Sapieha	Franciszek Ferdynant Lubomirski; 1710-1774	Magdalena Lubomirska; 1739-1780; Józef Lubomirski; Aleksander Michał Sapieha	Łucja Lubomirska; 1770-1811; Jerzy Tyszkiewicz	Laura Lubomirska; 1840- Zygmunt Festetics de Tolna	Andrzej Lubomirski; 1911-2003

== See also ==
- Lubomirski Rokosz
- Lubomirski Palace
- Łańcut Castle
- List of szlachta
