= Franciszek Sebastian Lubomirski =

Polish noble (died 1699)

- Prince
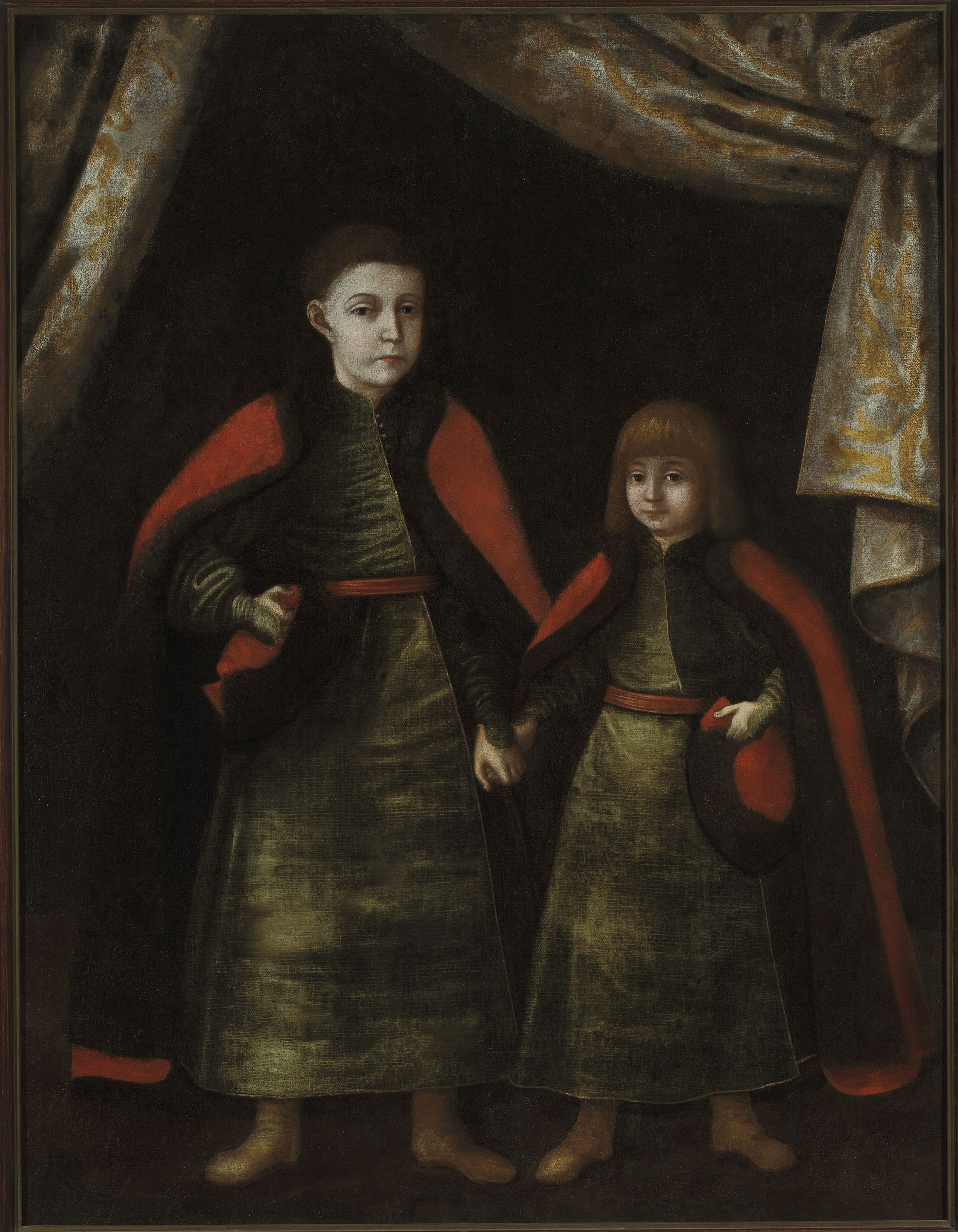
- Unknown - Childhood portrait of Franciszek Sebastian Lubomirski (^–1699) and Jerzy Dominik Lubomirski (ca. 1665–1727) - 128858 MNW - National Museum in Warsaw

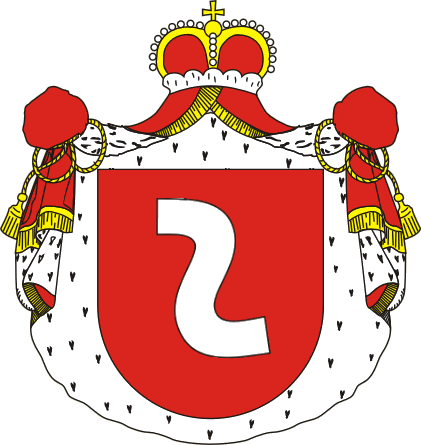
- Coat of arms: Lubomirski
- Born: 17th century
- Died: 1699
- Family: Lubomirski
- Father: Jerzy Sebastian Lubomirski
- Mother: Barbara Tarło

Prince Franciszek Sebastian Lubomirski (died 1699) was a Polish noble (szlachcic).

Lubomirski was the son of Grand Marshal and Hetman Jerzy Sebastian Lubomirski and Barbara Tarło. He was the owner of Łańcut, the starost of Olsztyn, and the Rotmistrz of an armoured cavalry regiment (Chorągiew pancerna). He took part in the Battle of Vienna in 1683. Deputy to the Sejms of 1690 and 1693.
