= Jan Kazimierz Lubomirski =

Polish noble (1692–1737)

- Prince
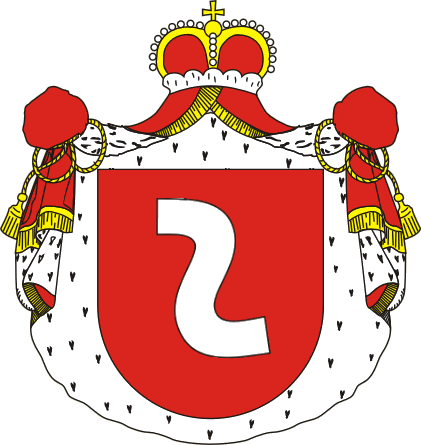
- Coat of arms: Lubomirski
- Born: 1692
- Died: 1737 (aged 44–45)
- Family: Lubomirski
- Consort: Urszula Branicka
- Issue: Maria Karolina Lubomirska
- Father: Hieronim Augustyn Lubomirski
- Mother: Konstancja Bokum

Prince Jan Kazimierz Lubomirski (1692–1737) was a Polish noble (szlachcic).

He was starost of Bolimów, owner of Głogów and Robotycze.
