= Hieronim Augustyn Lubomirski =

Polish noble and military commander (1647–1706)

- Prince
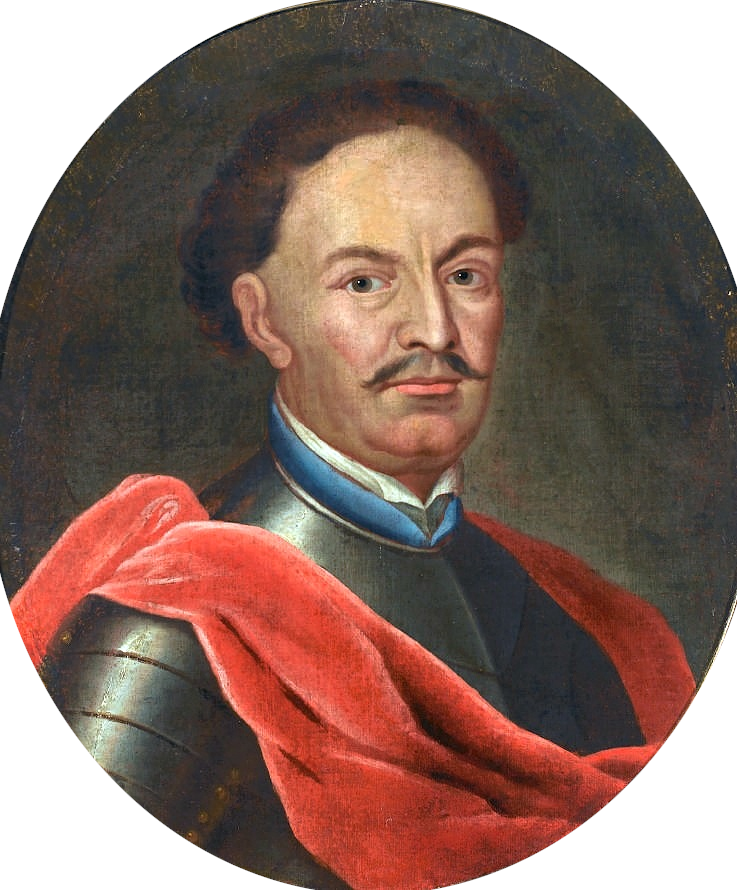

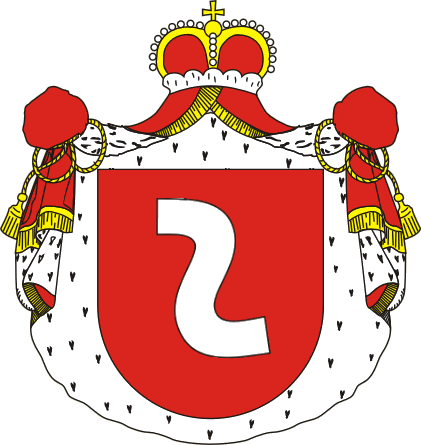
- Coat of arms: Lubomirski
- Born: 1647; Rzeszów
- Died: 20 April 1706 (aged 57–58); Rzeszów
- Family: Lubomirski
- Consort: Konstancja Bokum
- Issue: Anna Lubomirska; Marianna Lubomirska; Elżbieta Lubomirska; Jerzy Ignacy Lubomirski; Jan Lubomirski; Jakub Lubomirski
- Father: Jerzy Sebastian Lubomirski
- Mother: Konstancja Ligęza

Prince Hieronim Augustyn Lubomirski (1647–1706) was a Polish noble (szlachcic), magnate, politician and famed military commander. He was a Prince of the Holy Roman Empire SRI.

Son of Grand Marshal and Hetman Jerzy Sebastian Lubomirski and Konstancja Ligęza. He married Konstancja Bokum c. 1694.

He was owner of Wiśnicz, Jarosław and Rzeszów. Commendatory abbot of Płock, Knight of Malta, Great Chorąży of the Crown since 1676, Court Marshal of the Crown since 1683, Grand Podskarbi of the Crown since 1692, voivode of Kraków Voivodeship, Field Crown Hetman, castellan of Kraków and Great Crown Hetman since 1702.

Under the command of Jan Sobieski he fought against Tatars and Turks and participated in the expedition and siege of Chocim in 1673. He refused to join the "Lubomirski Rokosz" of his father in 1665–1666.

As Marshal he led the ordinary Sejm on 10 January – 21 May 1681.

He took part in the Vienna expedition in 1683 and become famous for his courage at the Battle of Vienna. He also participated in following campaigns in Hungary.

In the Kings election of 1697, he backed up the candidature of Prince Conti for the Polish throne.

He supported the Warsaw Confederation in 1704 against August II and the proclamation of interregnum, in the hope that he would gain the Polish crown, with the help of Sweden. He went into retirement from political activity, after the election of Stanisław Leszczyński.

== Awards ==
- Knight of the Order of the White Eagle, awarded in 1705.

== Children ==
- Anna married starost and voivode Franciszek Wielopolski.
- Marianna married Krzysztof Towiański
- Elżbieta married Jan Rybiński
- Jerzy Ignacy became General and Chorąży.
- Jan became starost.
- Jakub became Kuchmistrz, Miecznik and General.
