= Michał Lubomirski =

Polish general

Michał Lubomirski (1752–1809) was a Polish military commander and a Lieutenant General of the Polish Army. A son to Stanisław Lubomirski (1704–1793), he should not be confused with his ancestor Aleksander Michał Lubomirski.
