= Sonnet on the Great Suffering of Jesus Christ =

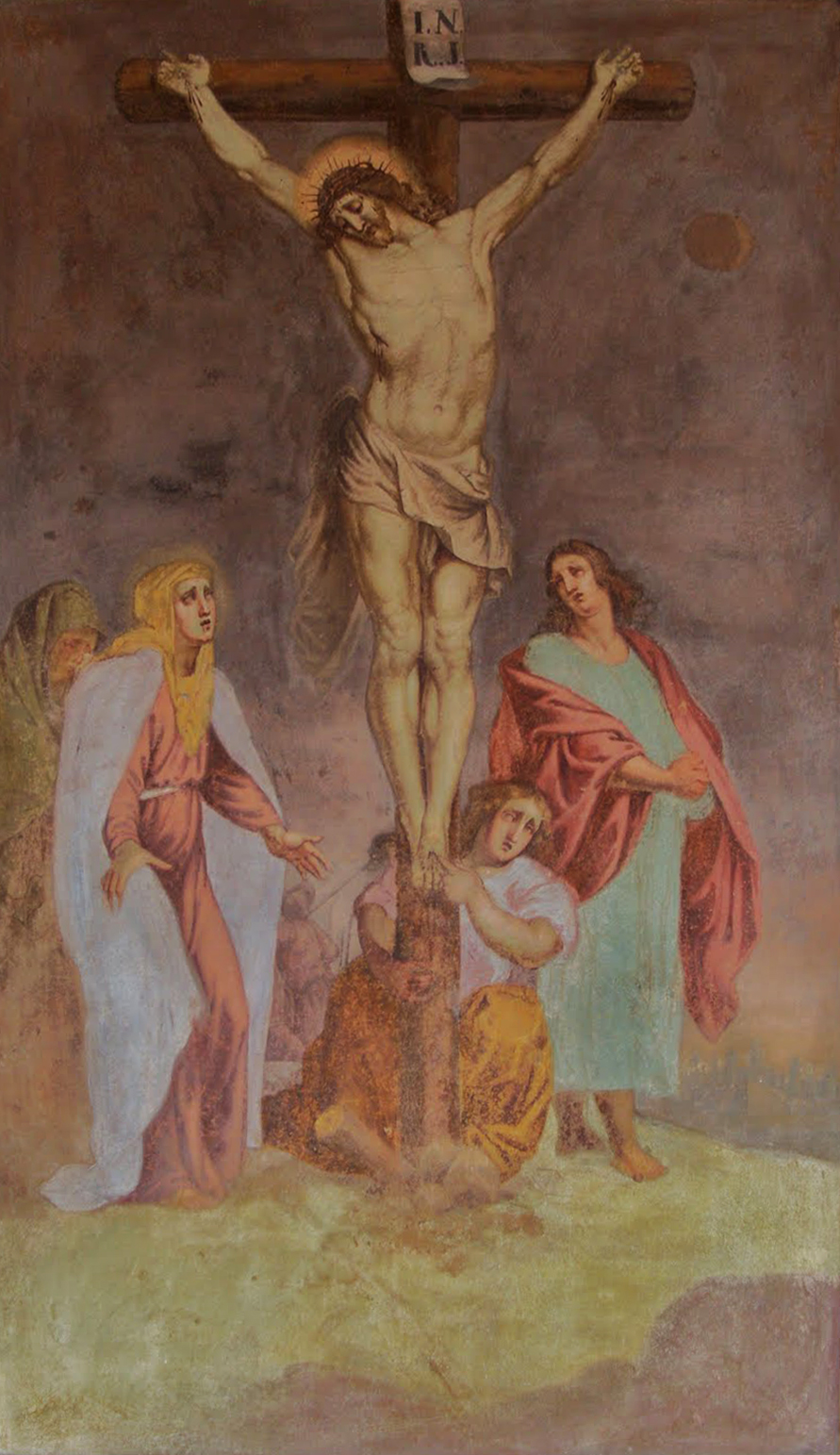
Crucifixion of Jesus Christ

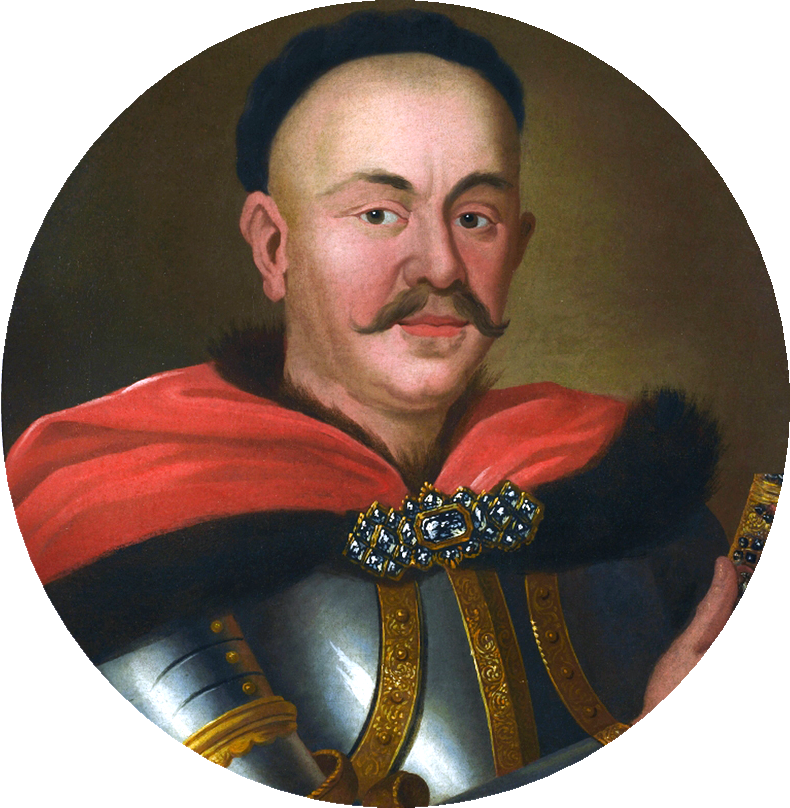
Stanisław Herakliusz Lubomirski, A soldier, politician and poet. A portrait by an anonymous painter, around 1670

"Sonnet on the Great Suffering of Jesus Christ" (in Polish Sonet na całą Mękę Pańską) is a poem by the 17th-century Polish poet Stanisław Herakliusz Lubomirski. The poem is the last in the sequence The Poems of Lent (in Polish Poezje postu świętego).

== Form ==
The poem is written in the manner of Italian or Petrarchan sonnet, rhyming abba abba cdc dcd. It is composed in typical 11-syllable Polish hendecasyllable lines having half-lines of 5 and 6 syllables, separated by a caesura:

o o o S s || o o o o S s
 o=any syllable; S=stressed syllable; s=unstressed syllable

Wielkiej miłości i nieogarnionej
Tryumf, czy piekła łupy, czy mogiły
Zawisnej śmierci, czy niebieskiej siły
Są cudem męki, co zniósł Bóg wcielony?

Moc, myśl, żal, strach, pot, krew, sen zwyciężony,
Zdrada, powrozy, łzy, sąd i niemiły
Twarzy policzek, i rózgi, co biły,
Słup, cierń, krzyż, gwóźdź, żółć i bok otworzony

Są to dobroci dary, a nie męki,
Nie dary, ale łaski źrzódła żywe,
Nie źrzódła, ale boskie cuda ręki,

Tej ręki, co nam zbawienie szczęśliwe
Z swych ran wylała, za które niech dzięki
Oddaje-ć serce, o dobro prawdziwe!

An interesting feature of the poem is the second quatrain's two extended enumerations using 1-syllable words that are very rare in the Polish language. A similar poetic device (Dźwięk, cień, dym, wiatr, błysk, głos, punkt - żywot ludzki słynie) was used earlier by another Polish baroque poet, Daniel Naborowski in the poem "The Brevity of Life" (in Polish Krótkość żywota).

== Translation ==
The poem has been translated into English by Michael J. Mikoś.
