= Aleksander Michał Lubomirski =

Aleksander Michał Lubomirski is the name of:

- Aleksander Michał Lubomirski (d. 1675), starosta of Perejesław and Nowy Sącz
- Aleksander Michał Lubomirski (d. 1677), voivode of Kraków
