= Sebastian Lubomirski =

Polish–Lithuanian nobleman (c. 1546 – 1613)

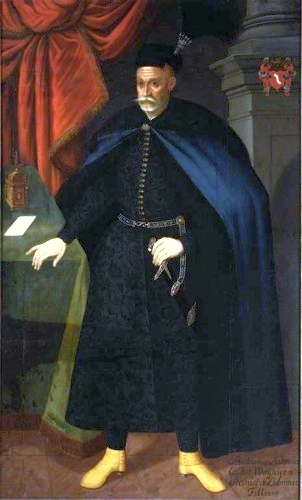
- Sebastian Lubomirski
- Coat of arms: Lubomirski
- Born: c. 1546
- Died: 20 July 1613
- Noble family: Lubomirski
- Consorts: Anna Branicka; Anna Pieniążek
- Father: Stanisław Lubomirski
- Mother: Barbara Hruszowska

Count Sebastian Lubomirski (c. 1546 – 20 July 1613) was a Polish–Lithuanian nobleman (szlachcic).

He was owner of Wiśnicz and Siercza. He was Żupnik of Kraków in 1581–1592, burgrave of Kraków since 1584, castellan of Małogoszcz since 1591, Biecz since 1598, Wojnicz since 1603 and starost of Sandomierz, Sącz and of Spisz.

Lubomirski had two consorts, Anna Branicka and Anna Pieniążek. He had six children with Branicka: Stanisław Lubomirski, Joachim Lubomirski, Katarzyna Lubomirska, Zofia Lubomirska, Barbara Lubomirska and Krystyna Lubomirska.
