= Władysław Emanuel Lubomirski =

Polish nobleman (1824–1882)

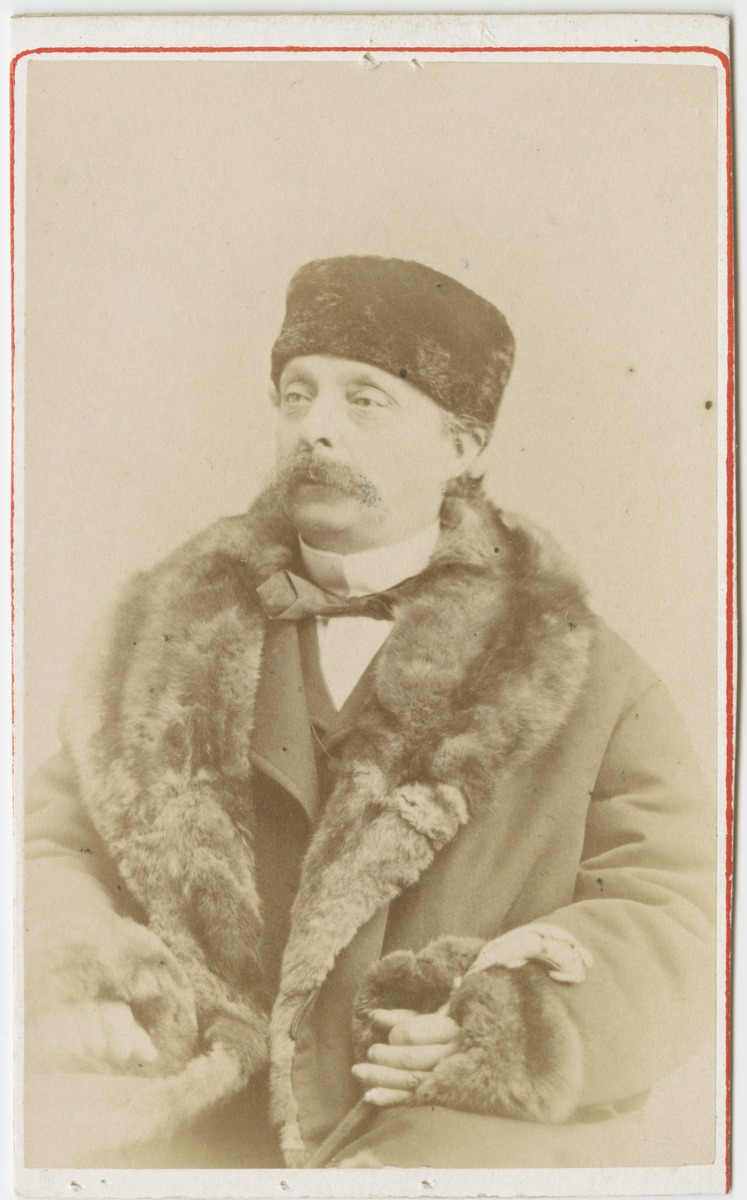

Władysław Jan Emanuel Lubomirski (19 June 1824 – 24 February 1882) was a Polish nobleman belonging to the Lubomirskis of the Szreniawa coat of arms without the Cross. He was a natural history collector and philanthropist. He amassed a large collection of molluscs from around the world through his network of collectors and described several species from his collections.

== Life and work ==
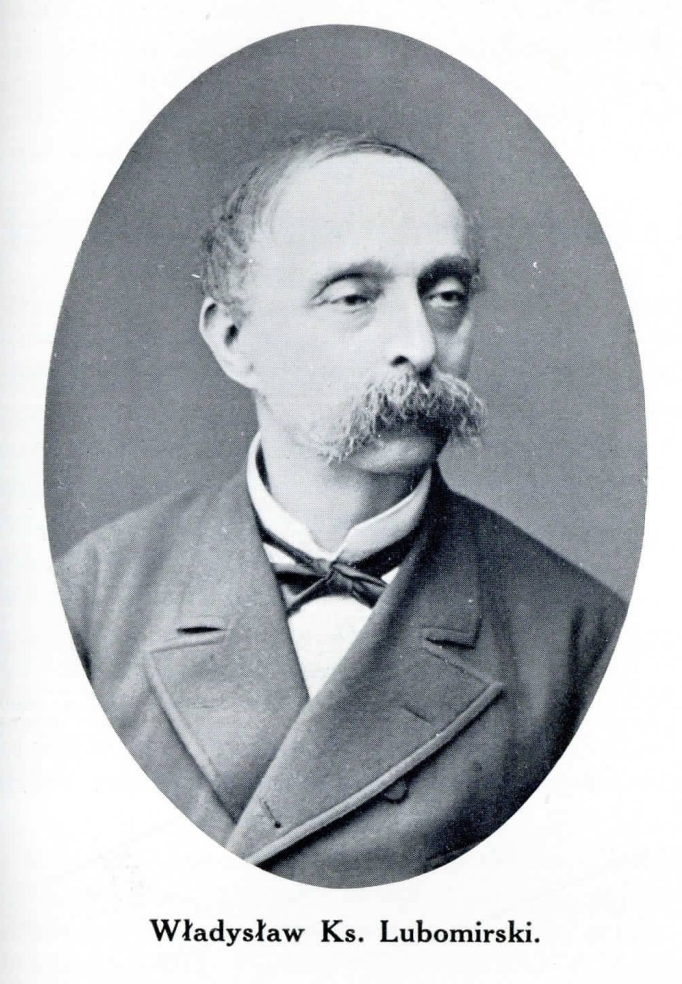

Lubomirski was born in Stanisławo, Mogilev Governorate (currently Belarus), the son of Prince Eugeniusz Lubomirski (1789–1834) and Maria née Czacka. He siblings included Eugeniusz Adolf (born 1825), Jan Tadeusz (1826–1908) and Stefan (1819–1900). His mother died when he was just three and his father died seven years later. The oldest brother Stefan became his guardian. He was educated at a school in Krzemieniec where run by the entomologist Wawrzyniec Czekanowski (died c. 1876). He then went to high schools in Kyiv and at Tsarskoye Selo near St. Petersburg after which he worked on his estate, serving between 1858 and 1863 as a marshal in the Orsha county. He produced a herbarium of local plants at Stanisławow and set up a botanical garden and library. He founded also a hospital and established primary schools where he supported education of the children of his workers. During the January Uprising he served (1863–1864) as a commissar of the voivodeship resulting in his arrest and exile to Russia. In 1867 he returned and settled in Warsaw where he began to work with the Branicki brothers Konstanty (1824–1884) and his Aleksander (1821–1877) to set up a zoological collection. He financed expeditions into Siberia, including those of Benedykt Dybowski (1833–1930), receiving plants from him that he grew in Warsaw. He also received South American plants from Konstanty Jelski and Jan Sztolcman. His collection included 8000 shells and a library of malacology with 305 books. The library was donated to a museum started by his brother Stefan. He also began to describe the snails from South America that were sent to him by Sztolcman but this work was unfinished. His collections went to the State Natural History Museum after his death. He was buried in the Powązki Cemetery in Warsaw.
