= Stanisław Lubomirski (1704–1793) =

Polish noble

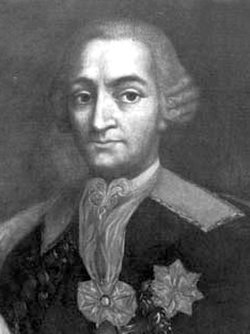
- Coat of arms: Lubomirski
- Born: 1704
- Died: 19 July 1793 (aged 88–89)
- Noble family: Lubomirski
- Consort: Ludwika Honorata Pociej
- Issue: Franciszek Ksawery Lubomirski; Rozalia Lubomirska; Marianna Lubomirska; Ludwika Lubomirska; Józef Aleksander Lubomirski; Aleksander Lubomirski; Michał Lubomirski
- Father: Jerzy Aleksander Lubomirski
- Mother: Joanna von Starzhausen

Prince Stanislaw Lubomirski (1704–1793) was a Polish noble (szlachcic) and magnate. He was the son of Jerzy Aleksander Lubomirski and Joanna von Starzhausen.

Stanisław became the Podstoli of the Crown in 1739. He became the voivode of Bracław Voivodeship in 1764 and of Kiev Voivodeship in 1772. He was also the starost of Nowy Sącz.

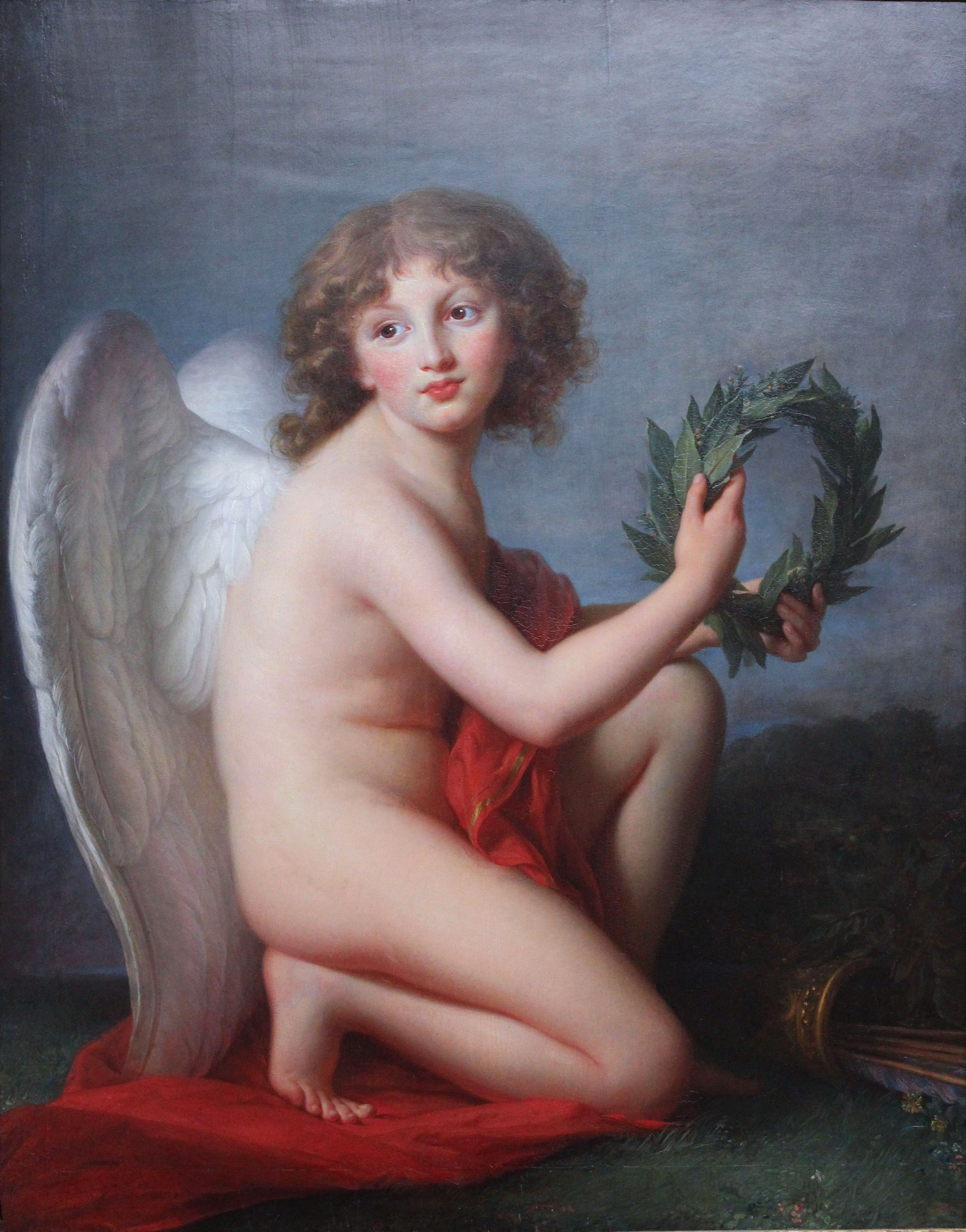
Prince Henry Lubomirski as "Genius of Fame" 1789 by Elisabeth Vigée-Lebrun

He owned large estates, 31 cities, and 738 villages and had an income of about 2,920,000 zł per year.

He was a knight of the Order of the White Eagle, awarded on 3 August 1744 in Warsaw.

He married Ludwika Honorata Pociej and had several children. His son Józef Aleksander Lubomirski's son was Prince Henryk Ludwik Lubomirski, who married Teresa Czartoryska. In the 1770s, Lubomirski arranged for three of his daughters to marry into the wealthy Potocki family: Elzbieta married Ignacy Potocki in 1773; Aleksandra married Stanisław Kostka Potocki in 1776, and Julia married Jan Potocki in 1783.
