= Franciszek Lubomirski =

- Prince
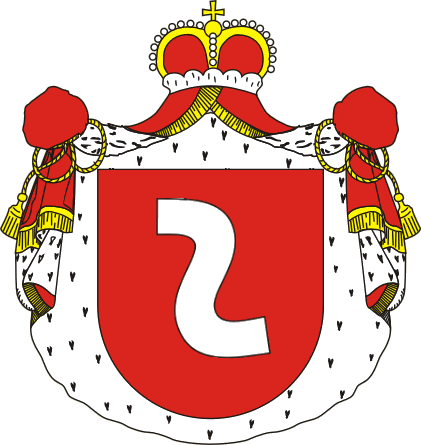
- Coat of arms: Lubomirski
- Born: 17th century
- Died: 1721
- Family: Lubomirski
- Consort: none
- Father: Stanisław Herakliusz Lubomirski
- Mother: Elżbieta Doenhoff

Prince Franciszek Lubomirski (died 1721) was a Polish noble (szlachcic).

== Biography ==
He was the son of Court and Grand Marshal Prince Stanisław Herakliusz Lubomirski and his wife, Countess Elżbieta Doenhoff.

He was owner of Rzeszów, Połonne and Łańcut, and General of the Crown Army. In 1721 he committed suicide.
