= Drużyna coat of arms =

Polish coat of arms

Drużyna
- Alternative names: Srzeniawa bez Krzyża, Corrulus, Curvatura, Krzywaśnic, Krzywaśny
- Earliest mention: 1371 (seal)
- Families: 19 names Białonocki, Białowodzki, Blencki, Bochun, Boczowski, Czemierz, Czerniawski, Drużyna, Kozubowski, Laskowski, Lubomirski, Lutomski, Łapka, Mikulski, Rupniewski - Rupniowski- z Rupniow - Rupnowski - z Rupnow - z Rupniew, Słupski, Sowa, Sąspowski, Stadnicki, Szow.

Drużyna (Srzeniawa bez Krzyża) is a Polish coat of arms. It was used by several szlachta families in the times of the Kingdom of Poland and the Polish–Lithuanian Commonwealth.

== Modern description ==
In the red field a silver curve. Jewel: Lion's head opposite, between two hunting horns with falcon bells of gold.

== Description by Niesiecki ==
In a field of red, a silver river obliquely, that is, like an S overturned flowing. In the jewel a lion's head of gold without a crown between two hunting trumpets, at each of which hang four bells. Some familiars wear it in such a way that they put a cross on the top of the river and call it Śreniawa, others wear the river without the cross and call it Drużyna. Others do not use the lion on the helmet, but only the trumpets themselves.

== History ==
The earliest heraldic source mentioning the coat of arms is the Insignia seu clenodia Regis et Regni Poloniae dated 1464–1480 by the Polish historian Jan Długosz, who recognises it as indigenously Polish. He records information about the coat of arms among the 71 oldest Polish noble coats of arms in the passage:"Druszyna a domo Srzenyawa absque cruce in campo rubeo defert Genus Polonicum in effusionem pronum sanguinis, beati Stanislai reum." (Latina), "Druszyna from the house of Srzenyawa without a cross in a red field brings the Polish race to the shedding of prone blood, guilty of blessed Stanislaus." (English).

The Drużyna coat of arms is the original version of the Szreniawa coat of arms. This is what Bartosz Paprocki says about it in Herby Rycerstwa Polskiego, citing Długosz, who, in describing Bishop Stanisław's death in 1060, mentions the Szreniawity, where the description of the coat of arms does not mention the cross, but only the river itself in the shield. Such a seal was still used initially in 1371 by Jan Kmita, starosta of Ruthenia, before becoming starosta of Cracow. Some of the families who used the Drużyna coat of arms actually constituted the starost's team and remained with this version of the coat of arms. These were mostly relatives of the starost. An important clue is the fact that from this point onwards, a new proclamation of the ancient Szreniawa coat of arms - namely Drużyna - began to appear in the records. In conclusion, there was originally a coat of arms called Szreniawa, but without the cross, and from 1371, when the proclamation Szreniawa was retained by the addition of the cross, those who remained with the earlier version of the coat of arms introduced a new name - Drużyna - to distinguish it.

== Notable bearers ==
Notable bearers of this coat of arms include:

- House of Lubomirski
  - Hieronim Augustyn Lubomirski
  - Jerzy Sebastian Lubomirski
  - Józef Karol Lubomirski
  - Stanisław Lubomirski
  - Stanisław Herakliusz Lubomirski
  - Stanisław Lubomirski (1722-1782)
  - Elżbieta Lubomirska
  - Stanisław Lubomirski (1583-1649)
  - Antoni Benedykt Lubomirski
  - Teodor Lubomirski
  - Aleksander Michał Lubomirski
  - Teresa Lubomirska
  - Sebastian Lubomirski
  - Katarzyna Lubomirska
  - Krystyna Lubomirska (XVII-1645)
  - Elżbieta Lubomirska (1669–1729)

== Gallery ==
Srzeniawa original version

Srzeniawa

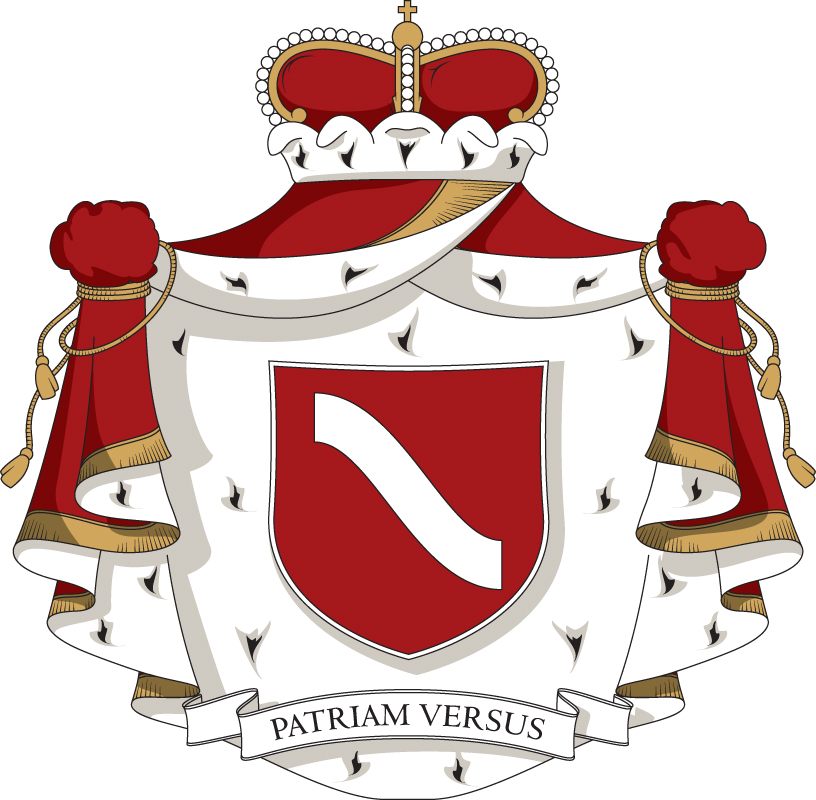
Princes Lubomirski

== See also ==
- Polish heraldry
- Heraldic family
- List of Polish nobility coats of arms

== Bibliography ==
- Tadeusz Gajl: Herbarz polski od średniowiecza do XX wieku : ponad 4500 herbów szlacheckich 37 tysięcy nazwisk 55 tysięcy rodów. L&L, 2007, s. 406–539. ISBN 978-83-60597-10-1.
- Kasper Niesiecki, Herbarz, VIII, 468-469
