= Jerzy Sebastian Lubomirski =

Polish noble and politician (1616–1667)

Prince Jerzy Sebastian Lubomirski
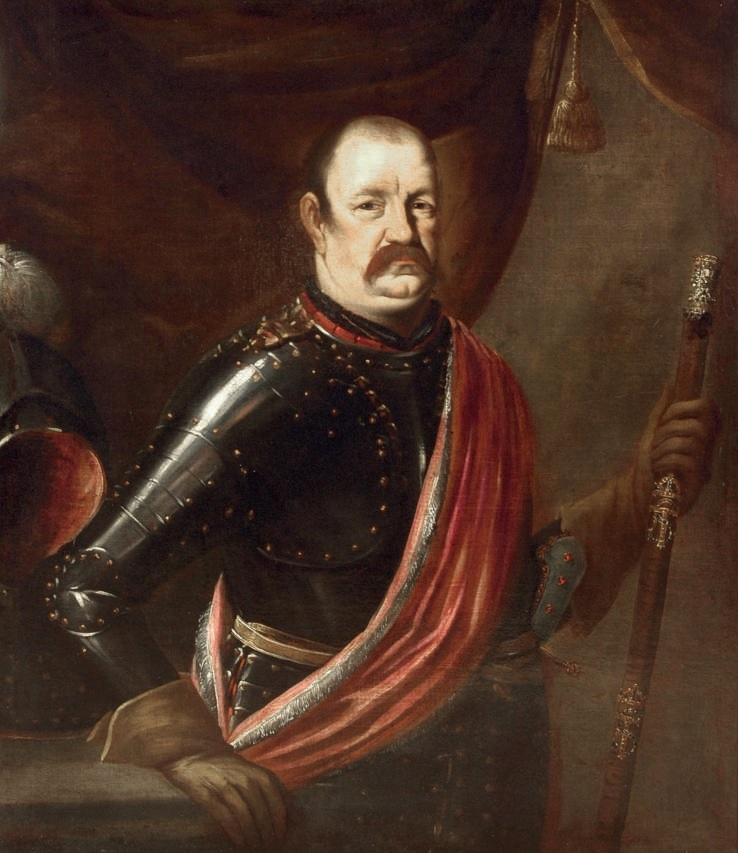
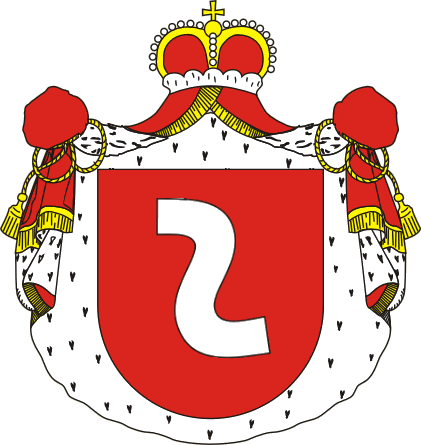
- Coat of arms: Lubomirski
- Born: 20 January 1616; Wiśnicz, Polish–Lithuanian Commonwealth
- Died: 31 December 1667 (aged 51); Breslau, Silesia, Habsburg Monarchy (now Wrocław, Poland)
- Family: Lubomirski
- Consort: Konstancja Ligęza; Barbara Tarło
- Issue: with Konstancja Ligęza; Stanisław Herakliusz Lubomirski; Aleksander Michał Lubomirski; Hieronim Augustyn Lubomirski; Krystyna Lubomirska with Barbara Tarło; Franciszek Sebastian Lubomirski; Jerzy Dominik Lubomirski; Anna Krystyna Lubomirska
- Father: Stanisław Lubomirski
- Mother: Zofia Ostrogska

Prince Jerzy Sebastian Lubomirski (20 January 1616 – 31 December 1667) was a Polish noble (szlachcic), magnate, politician and military commander, and Prince of the Holy Roman Empire. He was the initiator of the Lubomirski Rebellion of 1665–1666 against royal authority.

Lubomirski was the son of voivode and starost Stanisław Lubomirski and Princess Zofia Ostrogska. He was married to Konstancja Ligęza since 1641 and Barbara Tarło since 1654. He was starost of Kraków since 1647, Crown Court Marshal in the same year, Crown Grand Marshal since 1650, Crown Field Hetman since 1658, starosta of Nowy Sącz and Spisz.

He became Sejm Marshal of the ordinary Sejm between 1 February and 29 March 1643 in Warsaw.

== Biography ==
Lubomirski became famous as a commander during wars with the Zaporozhian Cossacks, Sweden, Transylvania and Muscovy in the 1648–1660 period. Inter alia he crushed the invading troops of George II Rákóczi and raided Transylvania. He also forced, together with Stanisław "Rewera" Potocki, Russian troops to surrender at the battle of Cudnów in 1660.

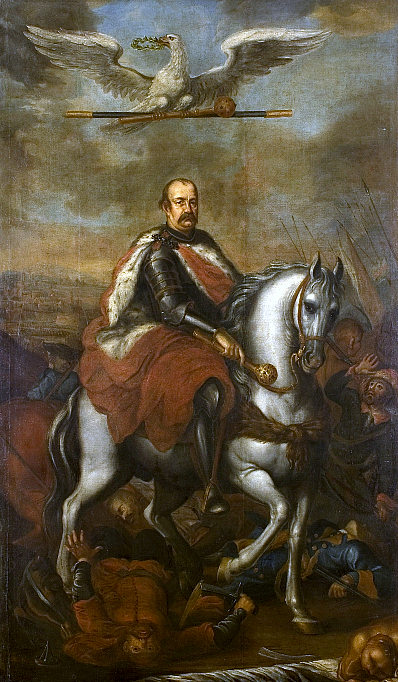
Allegorical equestrian portrait of Jerzy Sebastian Lubomirski after his victories over Russia

He was a staunch defender of the "Golden freedoms" and the leader of the fierce opposition to King John II Casimir, who was attempting to increase his power.

The King accused him of treason to the state and with an adjudication of guilt adopted by the Sejm, he lost all his offices and was sent into banishment in 1664.

However, in 1665 he started the Lubomirski Rokosz (Rebellion) and countermanded system reforms of the Commonwealth. Using his influence Lubomirski had two sessions of the Sejm dissolved, in 1665 by deputies Piotr Telefus and Władysław Łoś, and in 1666 by deputies Kasper Miaskowski and Teodor Łukomski. At the head of regular army units and some noble levy (pospolite ruszenie) forces, he defeated the Royal army at Częstochowa in 1665 and royal troops led by the future King John III Sobieski at Mątwy in 1666.

The Agreement of Łęgonice gave him back his dignity and annulled the earlier adjudication of the Sejm, the king was forced to give up his reform plans and the introduction of "vivente rege elections" and resulted in indirect abdication of the monarch in 1668. However, Lubomirski was forced into exile.

== Children and famous descendants ==
- Stanisław Herakliusz become Court and Grand Marshal.
- Aleksander Michał become starost.
- Hieronim Augustyn become Court Marshal, Treasurer and Hetman.
- Krystyna married Feliks Kazimierz Potocki.
- Franciszek Sebastian become starost and Rotmistrz.
- Jerzy Dominik become Podstoli, Podkomorzy and voivode.
- Anna Krystyna married Dominik Mikołaj Radziwiłł and Franciszek Stefan Sapieha.
