= Stanisław Lubomirski (1583–1649) =

Polish nobleman

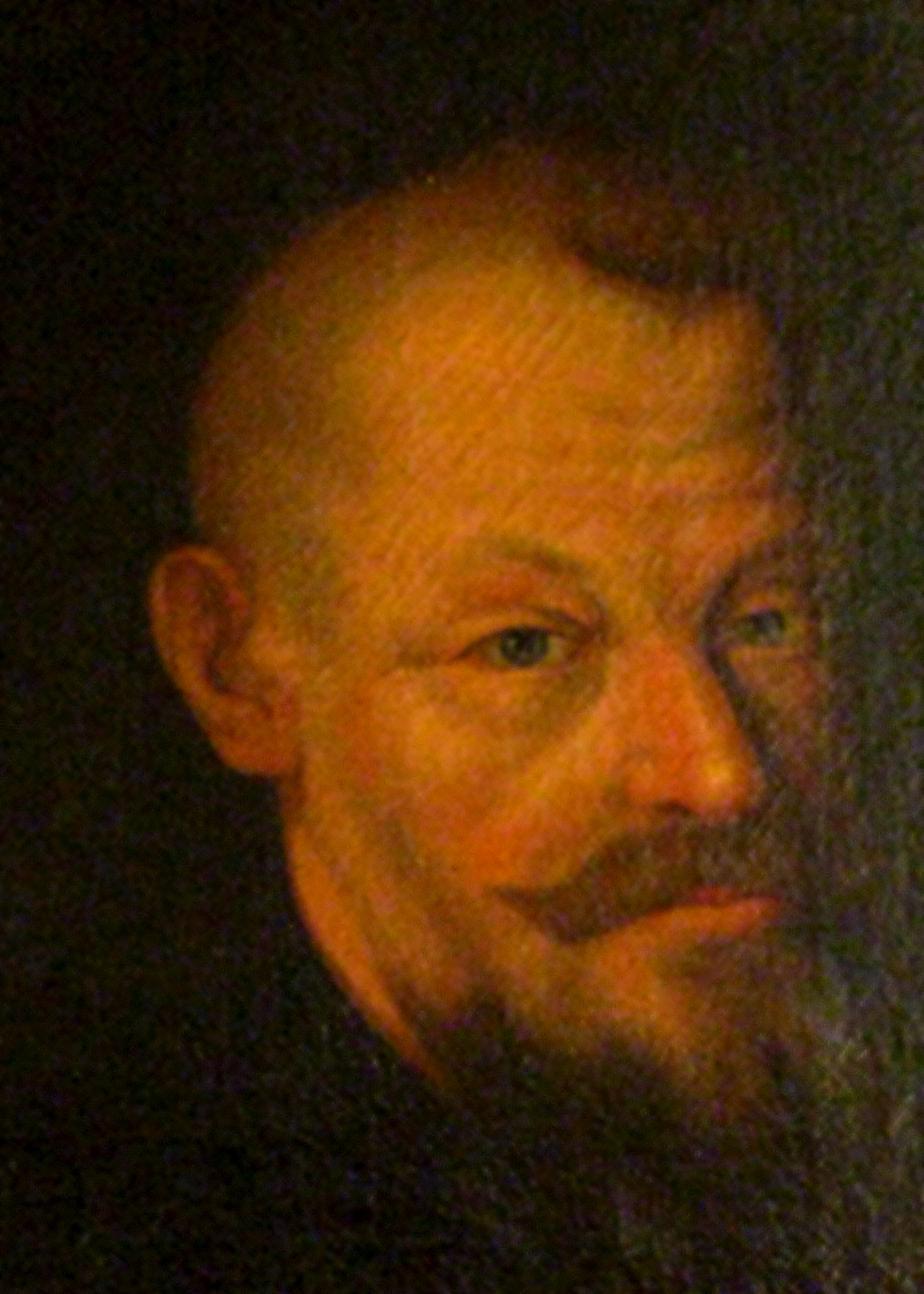
- Coat of arms: Lubomirski
- Born: 1583
- Died: 17 June 1649 (aged 65–66)
- Noble family: Lubomirski
- Consort: Zofia Ostrogska
- Father: Sebastian Lubomirski
- Mother: Anna Branicka

Prince Stanisław Lubomirski (1583 – 17 June 1649) was a Polish nobleman (szlachcic).

Lubomirski was Krajczy of the Crown and Secretary of the King since 1620, voivode (military commander) of the Ruthenian Voivodeship since 1628 (or 1625?), voivode of the Kraków Voivodeship and General starost of Kraków since 1638, starost of Krzepirz, Niepołomice, Spisz, Sandomierz, Sącz and Zator. Since 1640 (or 1647) prince of the Holy Roman Empire.

In 1609 he took part in the Siege of Smoleńsk by sponsoring several military units, which he used to keep order (and enforce his will) in the Kraków Voivodeship (his units defeated Lisowczycy after this mercenary band started pillaging Kraków areas in the 1620s). After the death of Jan Karol Chodkiewicz, in the rank of regimentarz he commanded the Polish forces during the battle of Chocim in 1621 (see Moldavian Magnate Wars). In 1634 Lubomirski was second in command in Ukraine, after Stanisław Koniecpolski, and in 1635 he befriended a French negotiator at the Treaty of Sztumska Wieś, Claude de Mesmes, Count Avaux.

Lubomirski was a pious Catholic, a sponsor and beneficiary of many churches, although he disliked the Society of Jesus. He opposed plans to marry Władysław IV Waza to a Calvinist princess. He also opposed Władyslaw's idea of Kawaleria Orderowa and his plans to wage war on Ottomans. Lubomirski was a friend of Jerzy Zbarski, a popular politician in Sandomierz and Kraków voivodeships, considered friendly but known to lose his temper and was several times elected as a deputy to the Sejm.

Lubomirski inherited a large estate from his father and multiplied it by a marriage with Zofia Ostrogska in 1613. They had five children together: Aleksander Michał, Jerzy Sebastian, Konstanty Jacek, Konstancja and Anna Krystyna. By 1642 he owned 10 castles, 12 towns, 300 villages and many forests, lakes, mills and even private salt mines, making him one of the wealthiest magnates in Poland of his time.
