= Wiśnicz =

- Village
- Location within Poland
- Coordinates: 50°48′7″N 20°10′14″E
- Country: Poland
- Voivodeship: Świętokrzyskie
- County: Jędrzejów
- Gmina: Małogoszcz
- Population: 250

Wiśnicz [ˈviɕnit͡ʂ] is a village in the administrative district of Gmina Małogoszcz, within Jędrzejów County, Świętokrzyskie Voivodeship, in south-central Poland. It lies approximately 7 km (4 mi) west of Małogoszcz, 21 km (13 mi) north-west of Jędrzejów, and 33 km (21 mi) west of the regional capital Kielce.
