= Jakub Tatarkiewicz =

Polish sculptor (1798–1854)

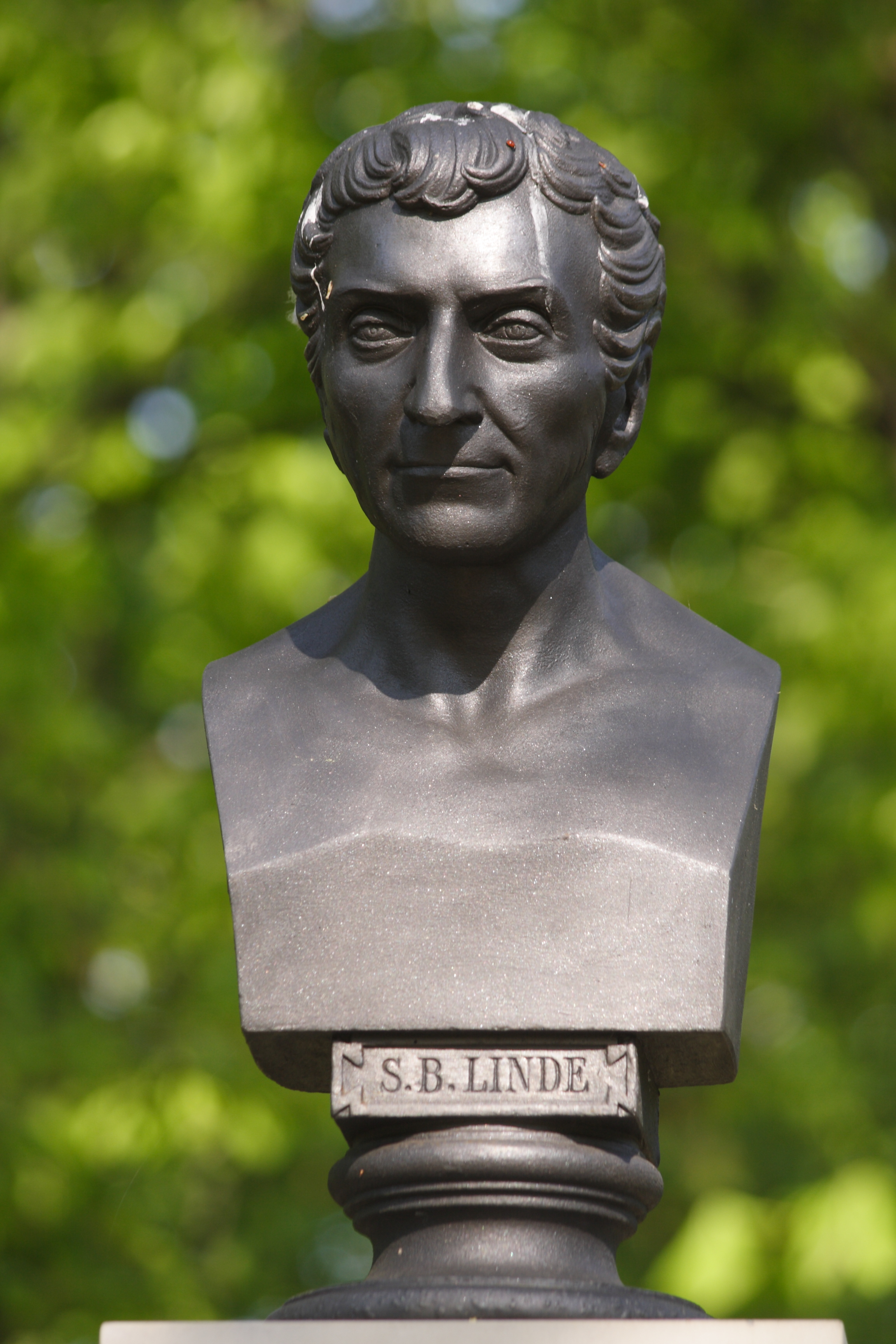
Bust of Samuel Linde

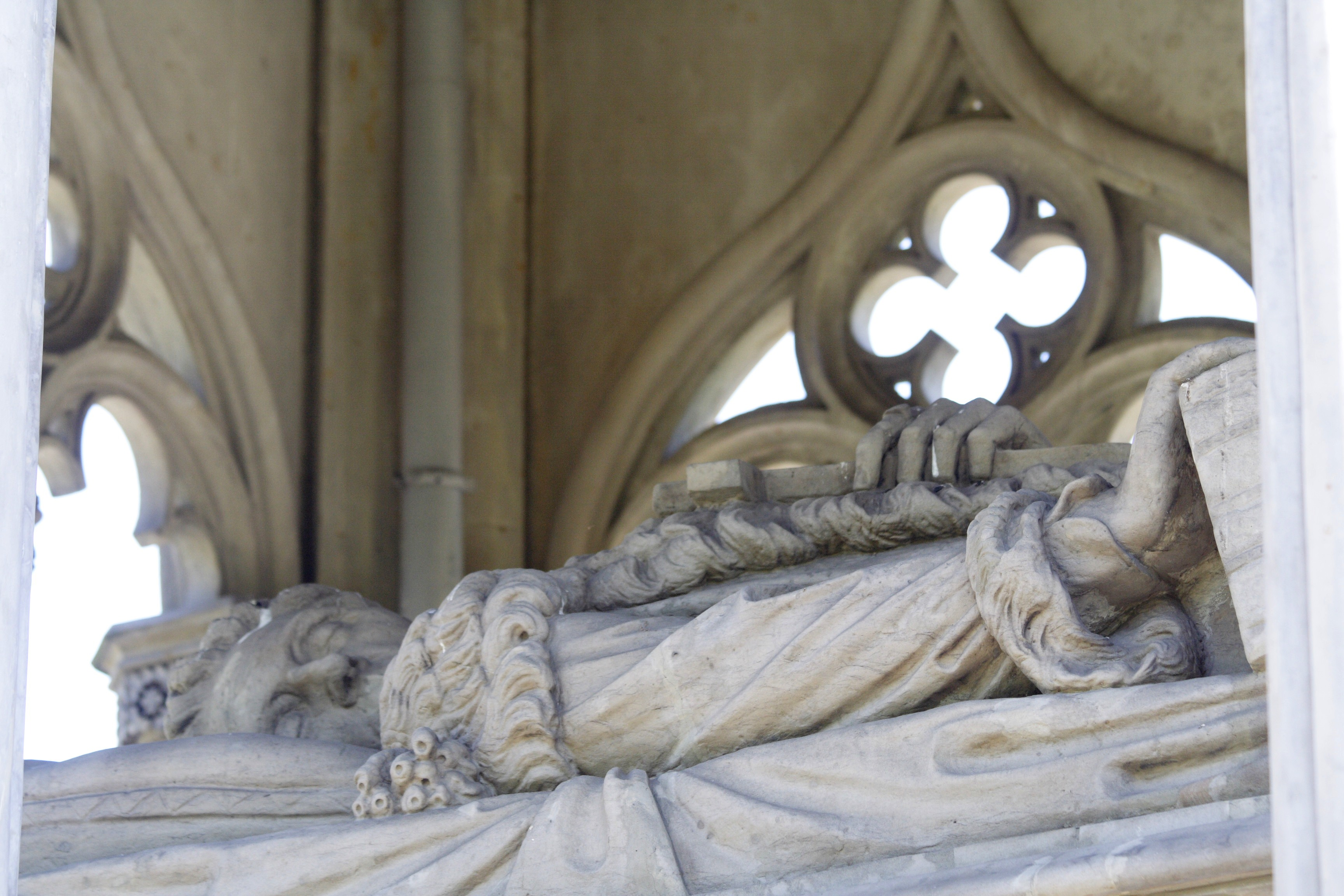
Figure of Stanisław Potocki

Jakub Tatarkiewicz (31 March 1798 in Warsaw – 3 September 1854 in Warsaw) was a Polish sculptor in the Classical style.

== Biography ==
He received his primary education in Piarist schools; showing an early talent for music and drawing. From 1817 to 1822, he studied in the Fine Arts Department at the University of Warsaw, where his instructors included Paweł Maliński and Antoni Brodowski. During that time he was awarded a scholarship and two exhibition medals.

From 1823 to 1828, he studied sculpture with Bertel Thorvaldsen in Rome; returning to Warsaw through Switzerland, France and Germany. His first orders for sculptures came from the Grand Theatre and the poet/statesman, Julian Ursyn Niemcewicz, who was an acquaintance of Thorvaldsen.

In 1833, he entered a competition for the post of "Professor of Sculpture" at the Jagiellonian University. He won the competition, but never assumed his post, due to cutbacks related to the recent November Uprising, which nearly resulted in the university's closure. From 1834 to 1840, he taught modeling and drawing at the Institute for the Deaf.

His major statues include "Dying Psyche" at the Grand Theatre, and figures of Stanisław Kostka Potocki and his wife Aleksandra Lubomirska, on the Potocki Mausoleum at Wilanów Palace. Notable among his numerous busts are those of Klementyna Hoffmanowa and Samuel Linde. He also did portrait medallions.

The philosopher and historian, Władysław Tatarkiewicz, was his grandson.

== Sources ==
- Poczet wielkich rzeźbiarzy (Among the Great Sculptors); Michał Domański; Instytut Wydawniczy "Nasza Księgarnia" (Our Bookstore), Warsaw 1981, pgs. 49–50, ISBN 83-10-07665-7
