= Elżbieta Izabela Lubomirska =

Polish noblewoman (1736–1816)

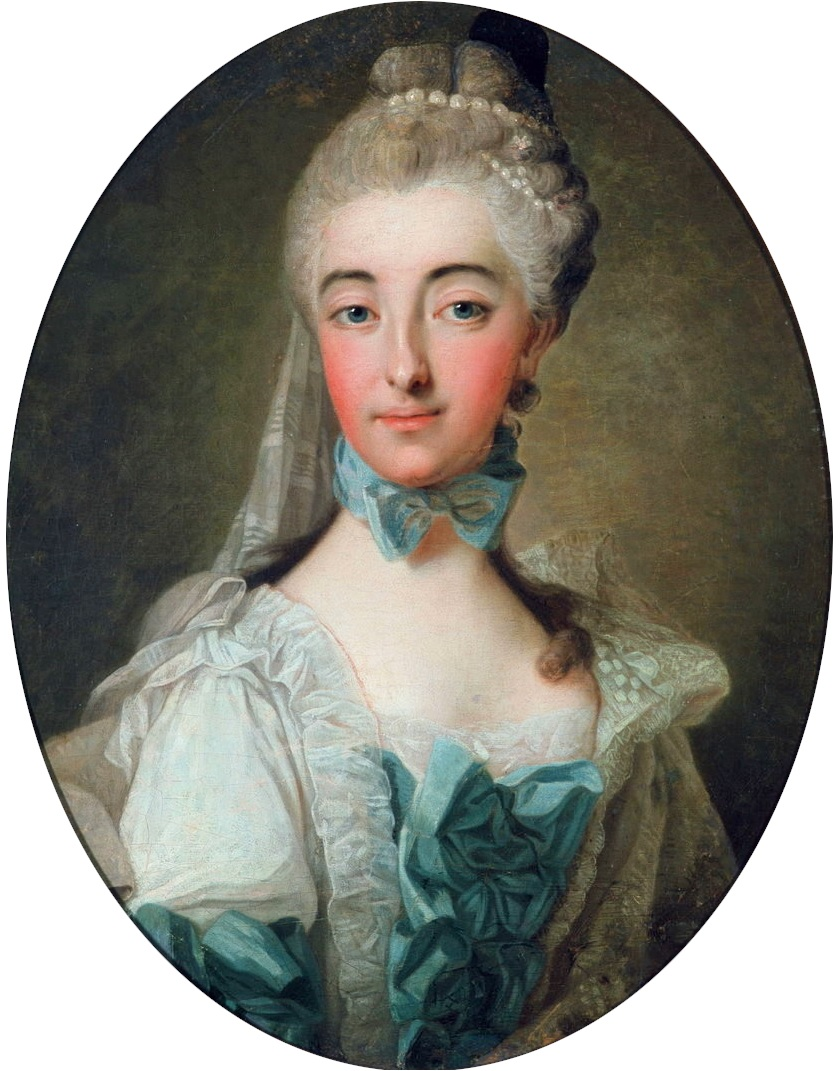
- Portrait by Alexander Roslin, ca. 1767.
- Coat of arms: Czartoryski
- Born: 21 May 1736; Warsaw, Polish-Lithuanian Commonwealth
- Died: 11 November 1816 (aged 80); Vienna, Archduchy of Austria
- Buried: Währing cemetery, Vienna; re-burial 1885, Łańcut Church of St. Stanislaus the Bishop
- Family: Czartoryski
- Spouse: Stanisław Lubomirski (m. 1753; d. 1782)
- Issue: Elżbieta Lubomirska; Julia Lubomirska; Aleksandra Lubomirska; Konstancja Małgorzata Lubomirska
- Father: August Aleksander Czartoryski
- Mother: Maria Zofia Sieniawska

Princess Elżbieta Izabela Czartoryska (21 May 1736 – 11 November 1816), better known under her married name of Izabela Lubomirska, was a politically influential Polish aristocrat, philanthropist and cultural patron.

== Life ==
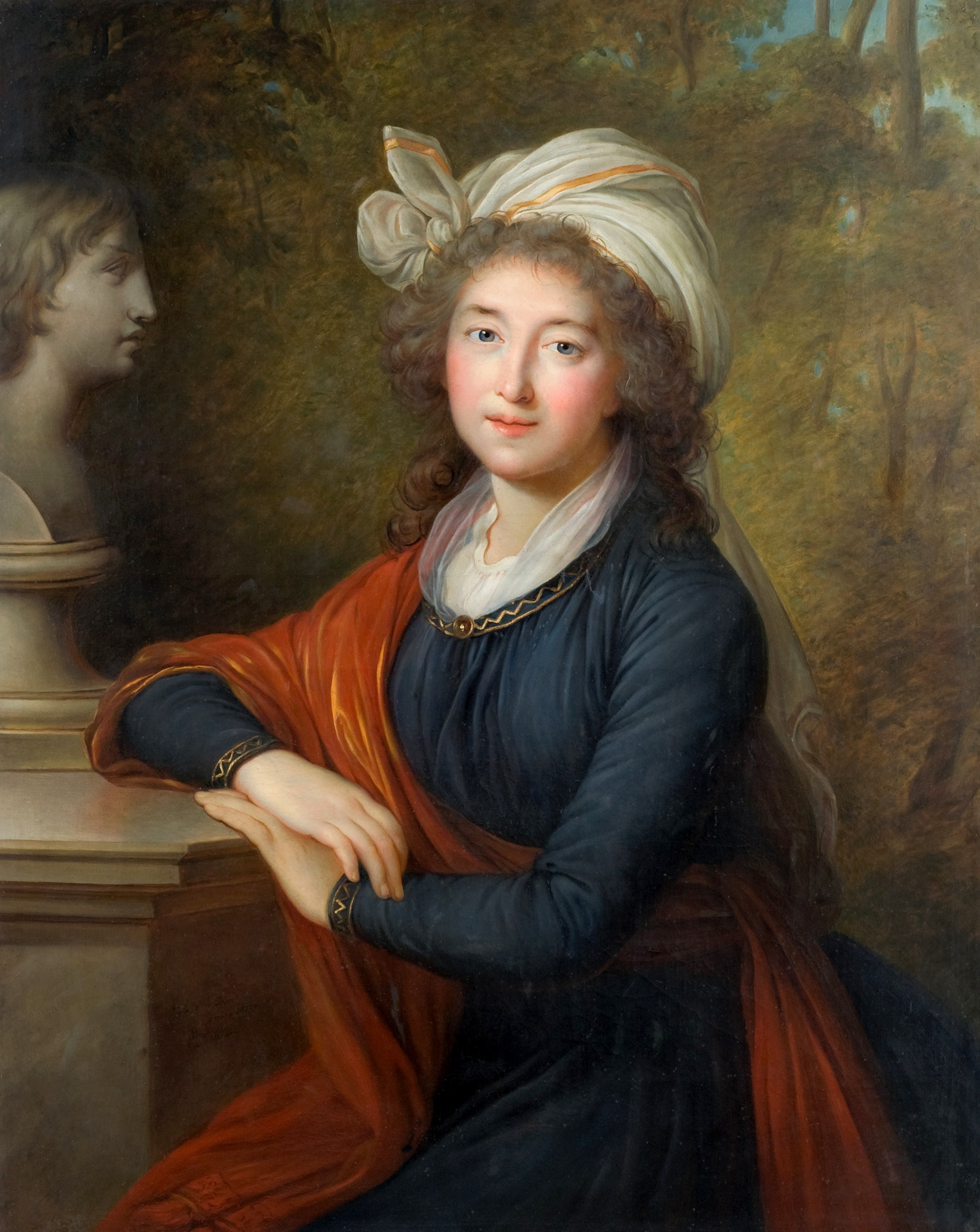
Izabela Lubomirska by Élisabeth Vigée Le Brun 1793.

She was the daughter of August Aleksander Czartoryski, one of the leaders of the Familia, and Maria Zofia Czartoryska. In her youth, she fell in love with her cousin, Stanisław August Poniatowski, later elected King of Poland as Stanislaus Augustus, but was unable to marry him due to the objections of her father, who thought him not sufficiently rich or influential.

Eventually, she married Stanisław Lubomirski on 9 June 1753, later Grand Marshal of the Crown, with whom she had four children: Julia Lubomirska, Konstancja Małgorzata Lubomirska, Elżbieta Lubomirska and Aleksandra Lubomirska.

She was a member of the Women's Adoption Lodge - Dobroczynność (Charity) - of the Polish Freemasons from 1783. Because of her liking for blue, which she often wore, she was called the "Blue Marquise".

She was one of the biggest and the wealthiest landowners in the Commonwealth. Her properties included the palace in Wilanów (prior royal residence of John III Sobieski) near Warsaw, the palace in Ursynów (then called Rozkosz, translating as Plaisance), which she built for her daughter Aleksandra, and the Mon Coteau palace in Mokotów (today's Szustra Palace). She laid the cornerstone for the building of the National Theatre in Warsaw and initiated the reconstruction of her husband's family estate, the Łańcut Castle, in the Rococo style.

Undoubtedly, she was one of the most outstanding women in Poland in the 18th century. She took a very active part in the politics of her camp, strove both for the acquisition of foreign courts and the masses of the Polish nobility. At first, she was very fond of her youth's presumed lover, Stanisław August, then she fought him passionately. Embittered by the failure of her actions at court, she moved to Paris, and after the outbreak of the revolution, she escaped to Vienna. Apart from her political activity, she distinguished herself as a progressive protector of peasants — she founded schools and hospitals in her estates.

She died on November 25, 1816, in Vienna. She was buried in the Währing cemetery in Vienna. On September 23, 1885, due to the liquidation of the cemetery in Währing, the coffin was transported to the Church of St. Stanislaus the Bishop in Łańcut, where it was buried again. Earlier, a monument of white Carrara marble was erected in the temple, funded by count Alfred Potocki.

In the Łańcut estate, she founded a distillery which exists today under the name Polmos Łańcut.

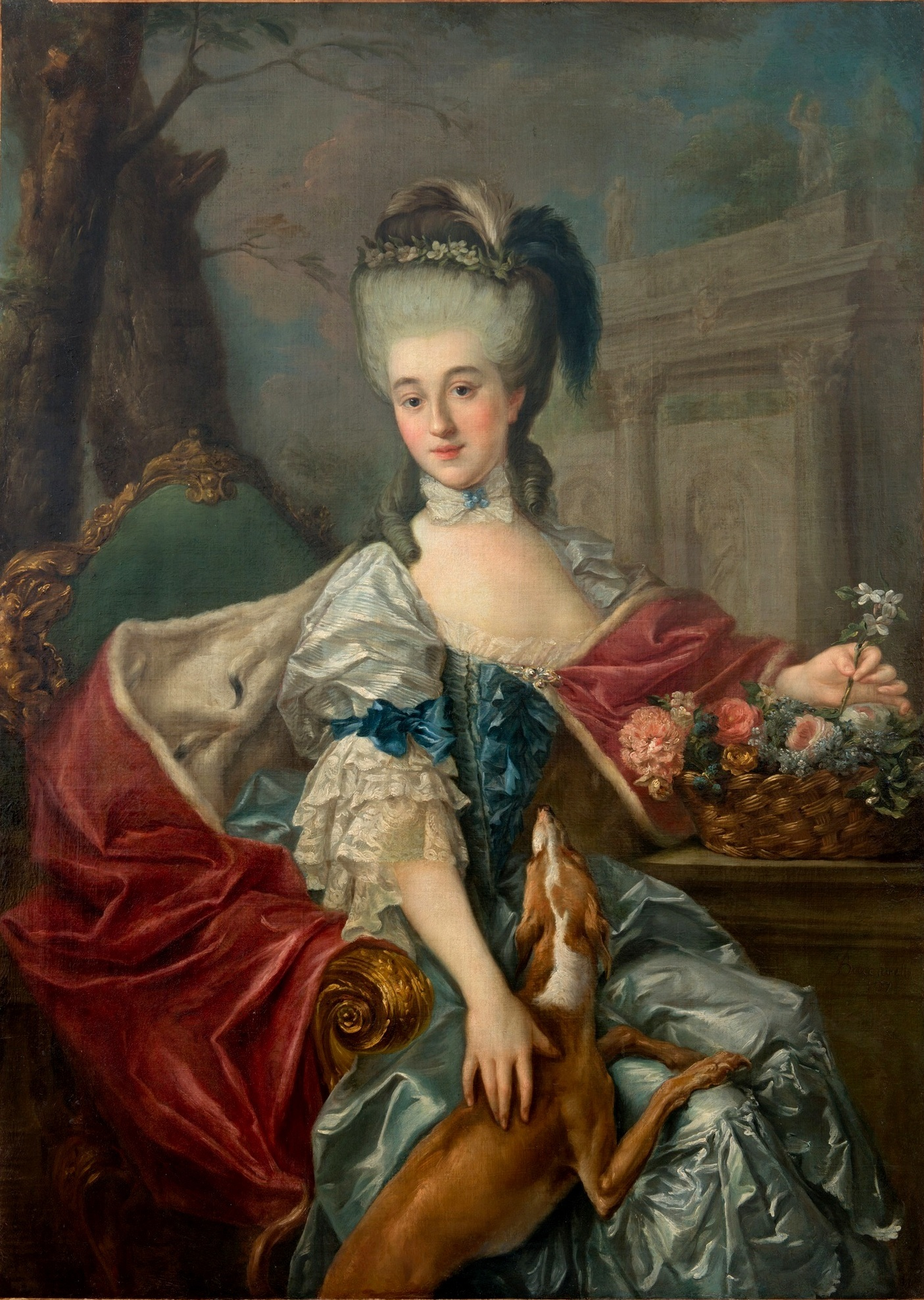
Portrait by Marcello Bacciarelli, 1757.

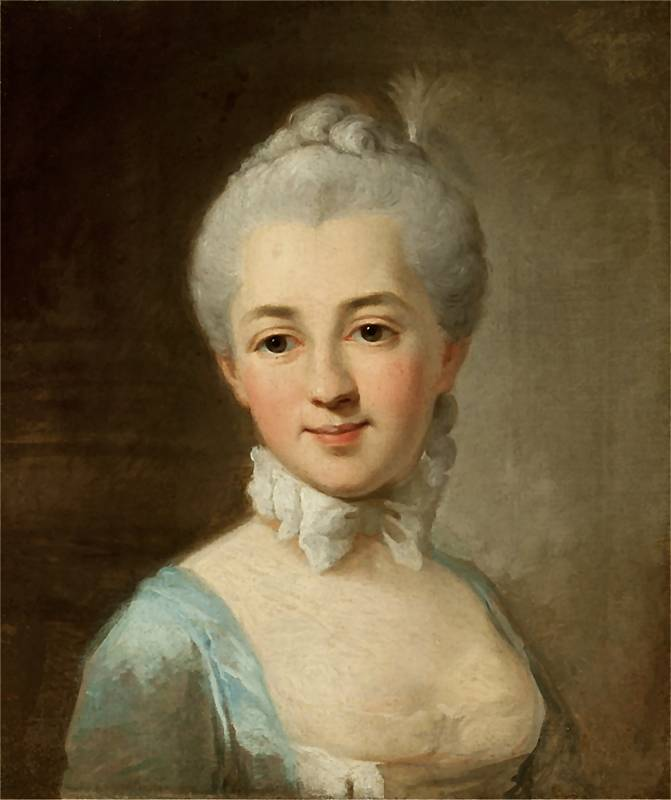
Portrait by Per Krafft the Elder, after Alexander Roslin 1767.

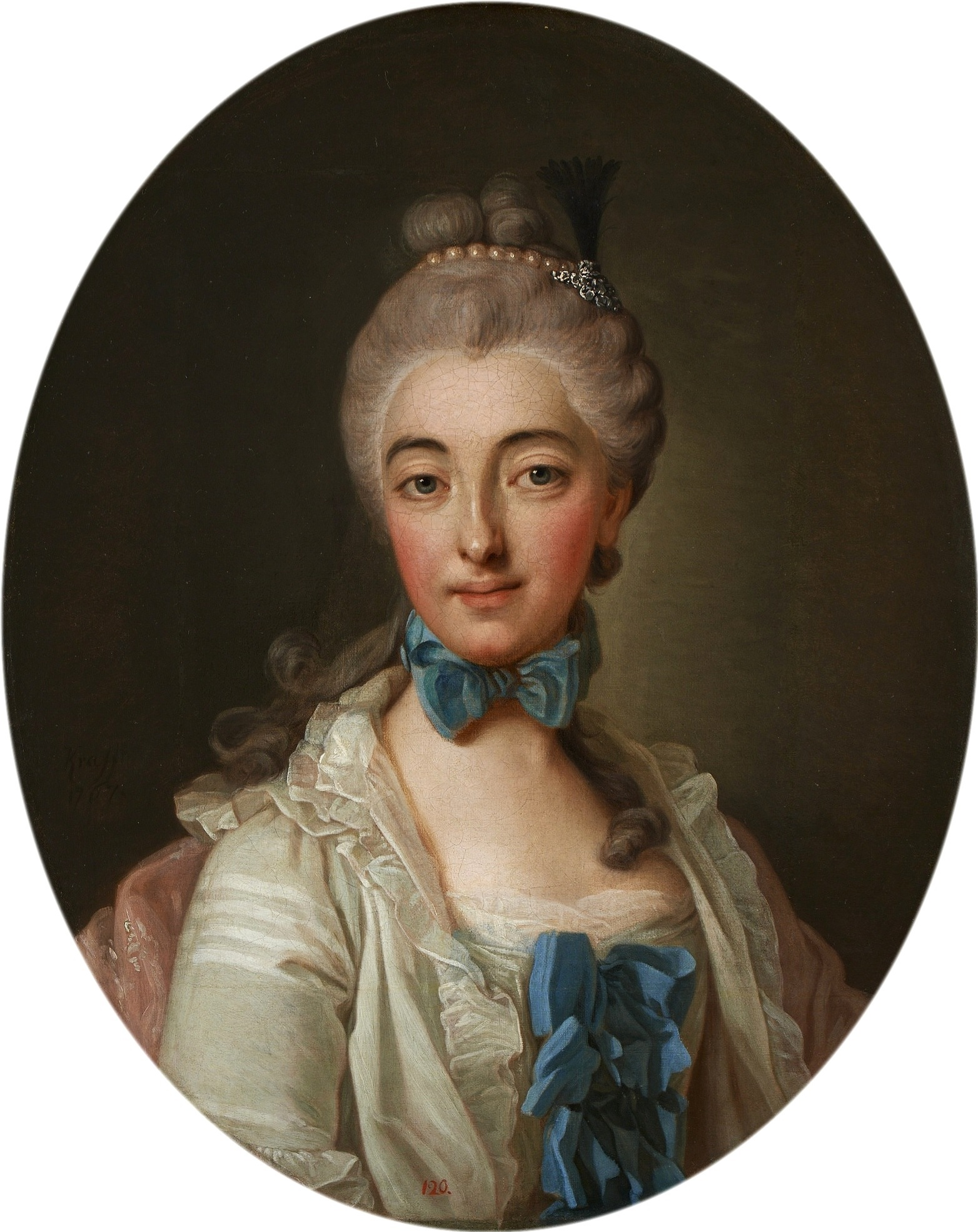
Portrait by Per Krafft the Elder, after Alexander Roslin 1767.

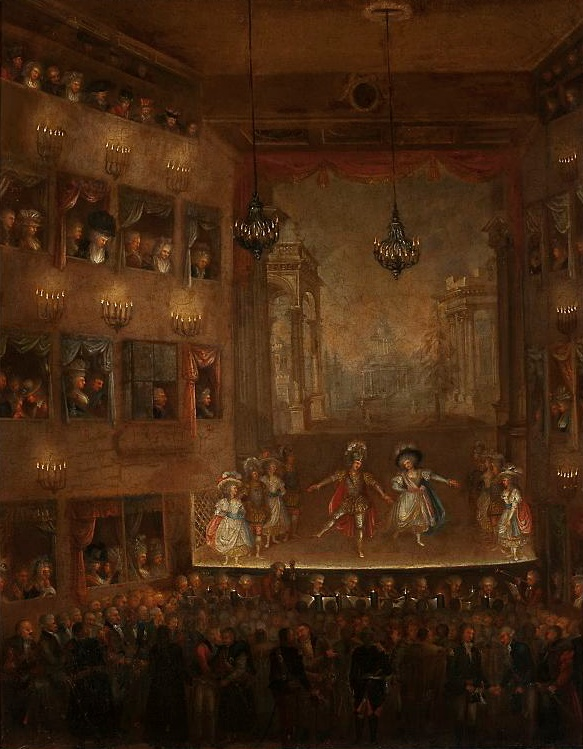
Play in the presence of king Stanisław II August, 1790. The painting depicts the interior of the first National Theatre in Warsaw situated at the Krasiński Square. This theatre was generously supported by Elżbieta Lubomirska.

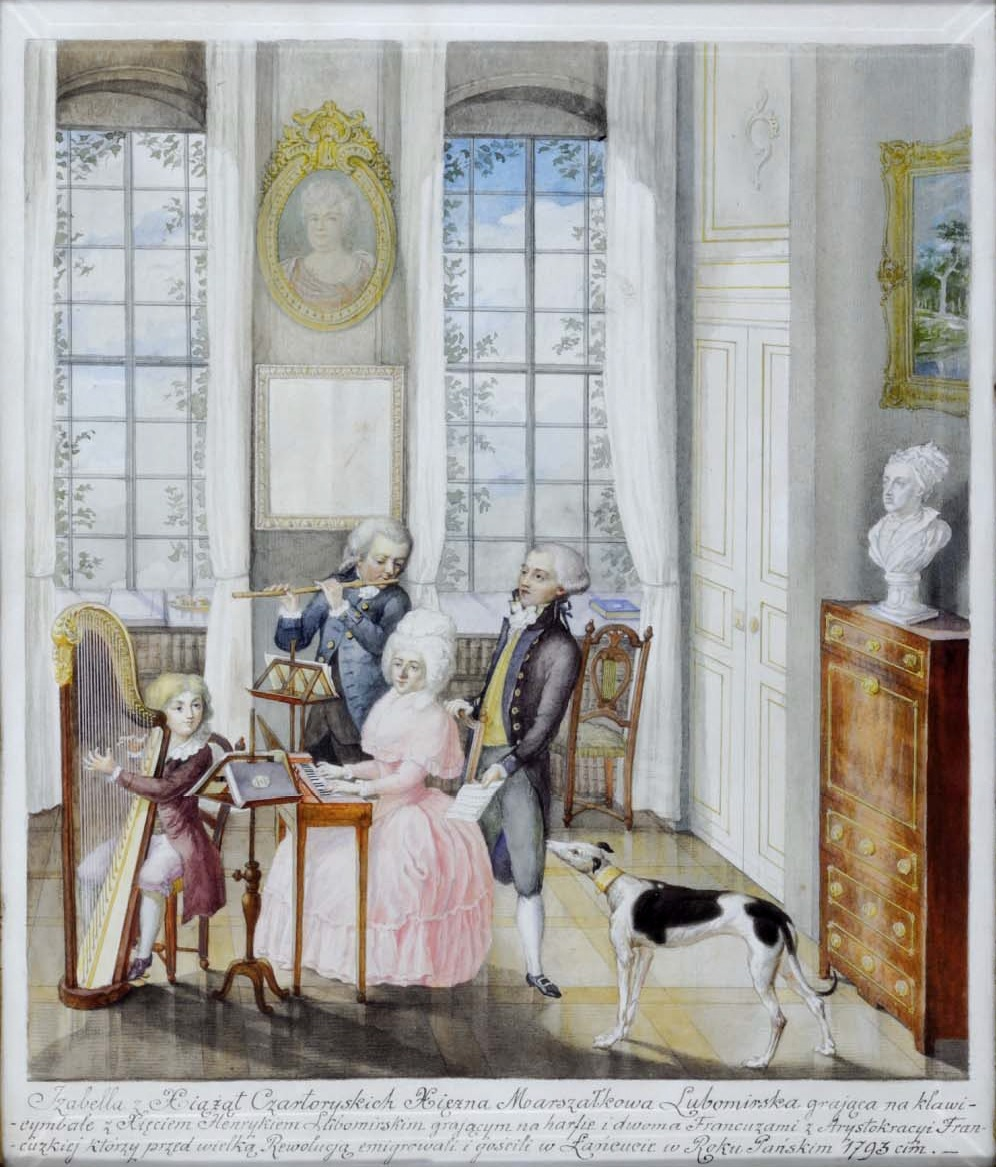
Izabela Lubomirska playing a concert with Prince Henryk Lubomirski (playing the harp) and her two French acquaintances in Łańcut, 1793.

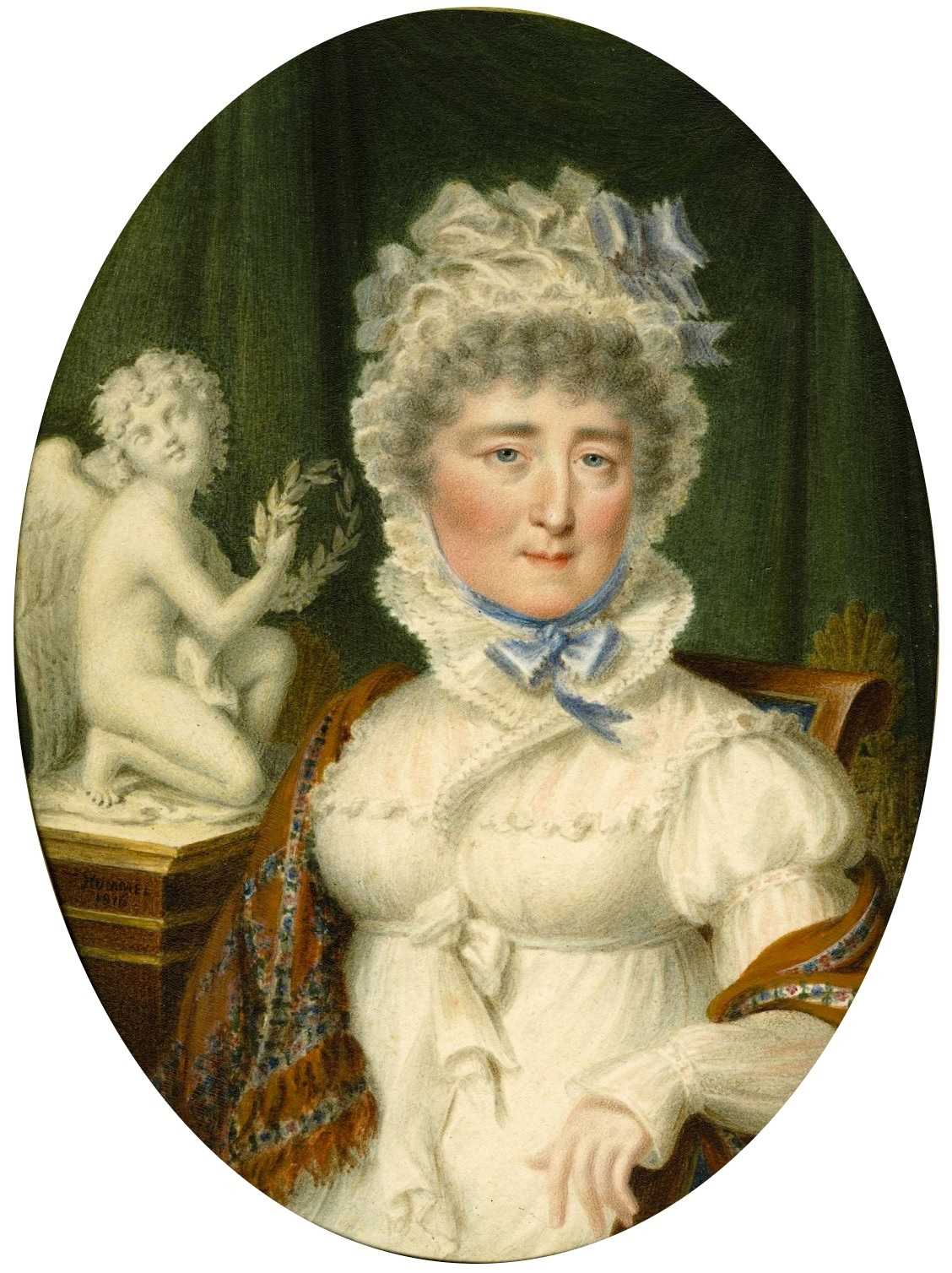
Portrait by Carl Hummel 1816.
