= Potocki Mausoleum =

Gothic Revival mausoleum in Warsaw, Poland

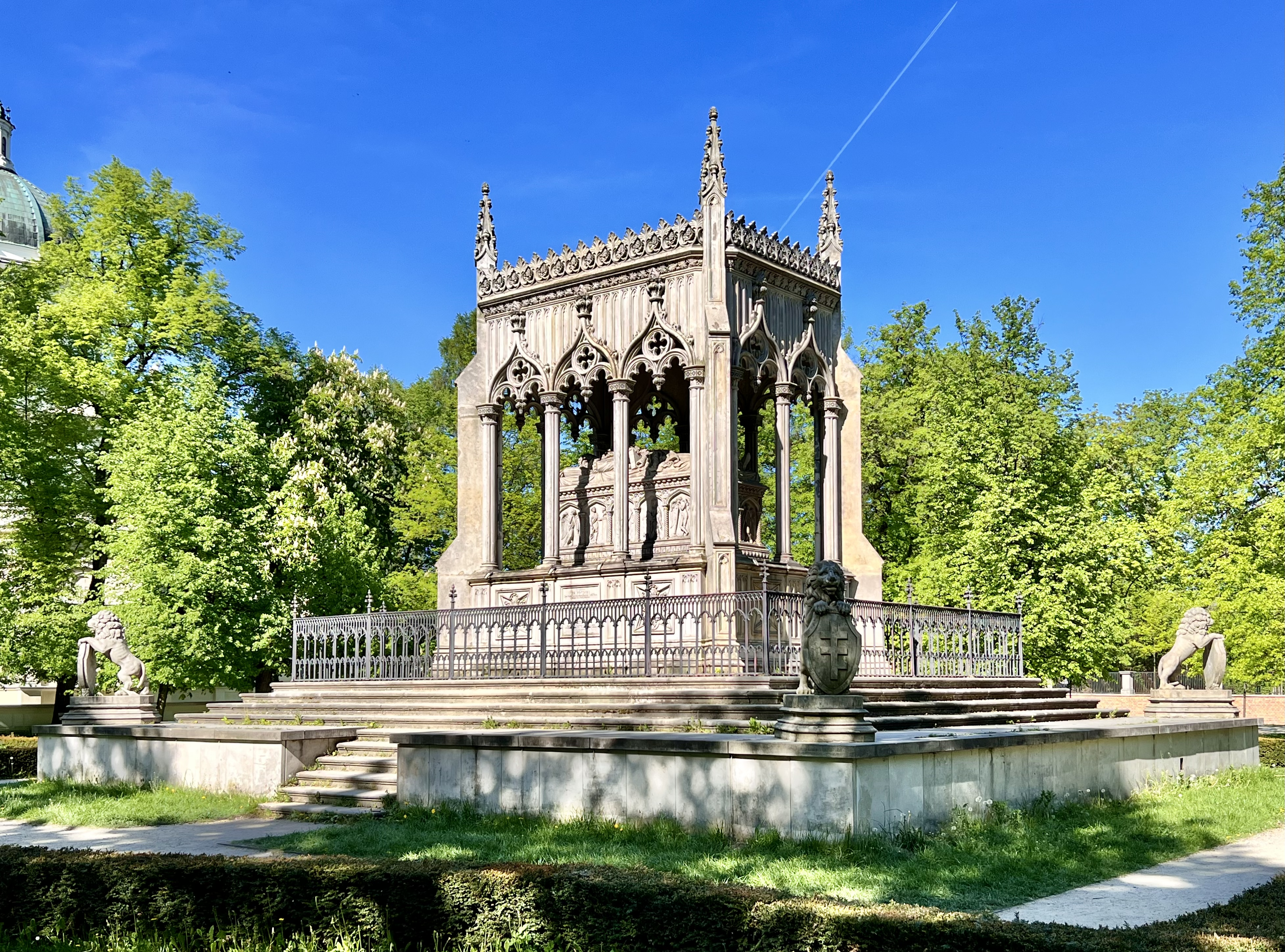
- The Potocki Mausoleum in 2022.
- Interactive map of the Potocki Mausoleum area

General information
- Type: Mausoleum
- Architectural style: Gothic Revival
- Location: 10 Potockiego Street, Wilanów, Warsaw, Poland
- Coordinates: 52°09′56.01″N 21°05′15.2″E
- Construction started: 1834
- Completed: 1836

Design and construction
- Architect: Enrico Marconi
- Developer: Aleksander Stanisław Potocki
- Other designers: Jakub Tatarkiewicz (sarcophagus); Konstanty Hegel (statues)

The Potocki Mausoleum (Polish: [pɔˈtɔt͡s.ki]; Polish: Mauzoleum Potockich), also known as the Mausoleum of Stanisław Kostka Potocki and Aleksandra Potocka (Polish: Mauzoleum Stanisława Kostki i Aleksandry Potockich), is a Gothic Revival mausoleum in Warsaw, Poland, located within the Wilanów district, next to the Wilanów Palace, at 10 Potockiego Street. Designed by Enrico Marconi, and built between 1834 and 1836, it forms the symbolic grave of Stanisław Kostka Potocki (1755–1821), nobleman, politician, writer, and landowner, and his wife, Aleksandra Potocka (1760–1836).

== History ==
The mausoleum was designed by Enrico Marconi in the Gothic Revival style, as a symbolic grave of count Stanisław Kostka Potocki (1755–1821), a nobleman, politician, writer, and landowner, and his wife, princess Aleksandra Potocka (1760–1836). It was commissioned by their son, count Aleksander Stanisław Potocki. The mausoleum was constructed between 1834 and 1836, next to the Wilanów Palace, which was owned by the Potocki family from 1799. The sarcophagus with reliefs of the Potockis were sculptured by Jakub Tatarkiewicz, while statues of lions holding shields, surrounding the structure, as well as reliefs of the coat of arms on the façade, were sculptured by Konstanty Hegel.

In 1965, it received the status of a protected cultural property.

== Characteristics ==
The mausoleum consists of a Gothic Revival baldachin placed on a broad plinth. Small sandstone statues of lions, are placed at the each of its corners. A half of them hold shields depicting the Pilawa coat of arms of the Potocki family, while the other half, the Drużyna coat of arms of the Lubomirski family. The coat of arms are also carved in the façade of the plinth. A sandstone sarcophagus is placed beneath the baldachin, with reliefs depicting Stanisław Kostka Potocki and Aleksandra Potocka in their sleep, on its top, and with reliefs on its sides, depicting personifications of the deceased's interests and virtues, as well as Geniuses from the Roman religion, as personifications of death.

== Gallery ==
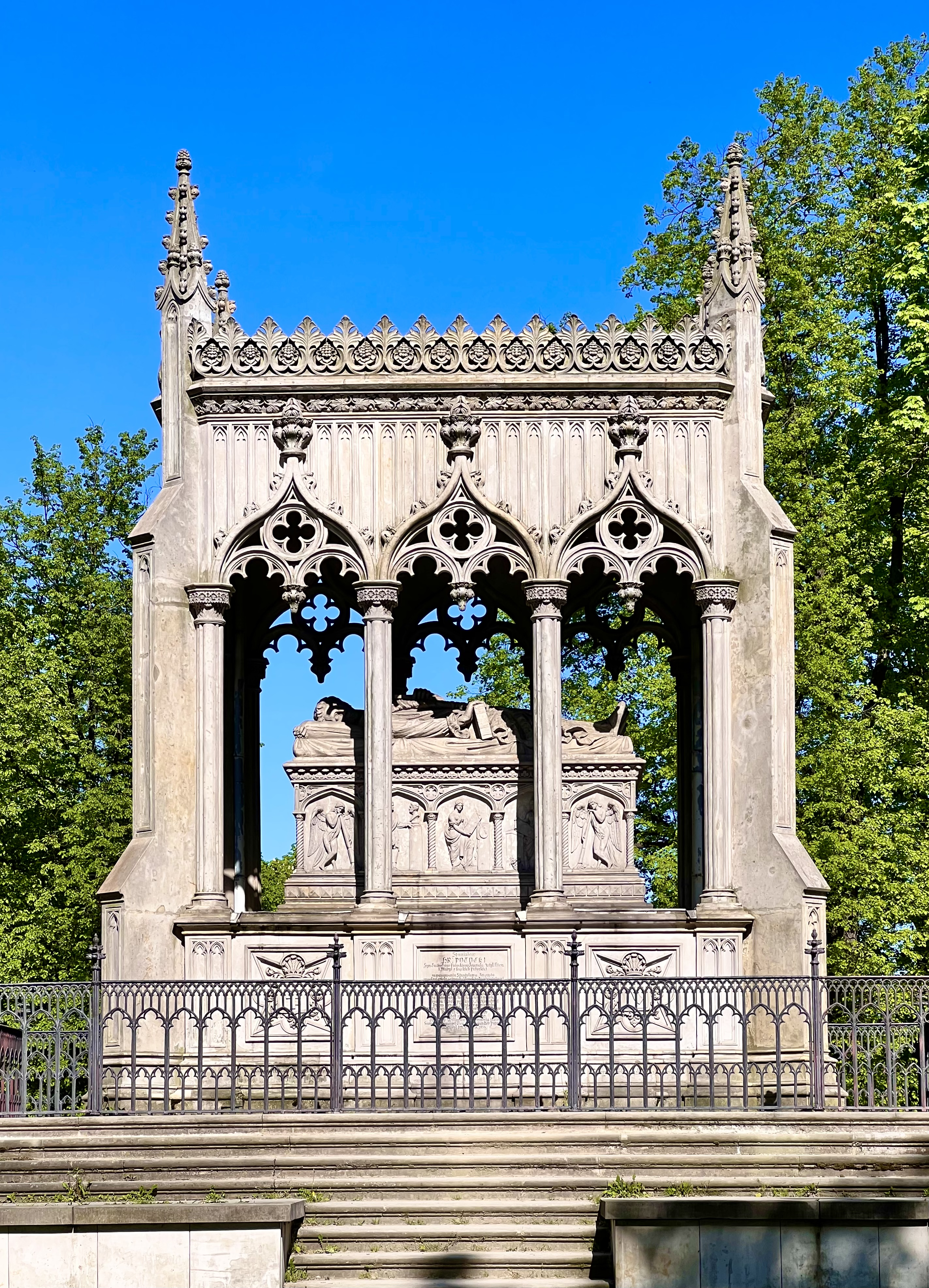
The side of the mausoleum.

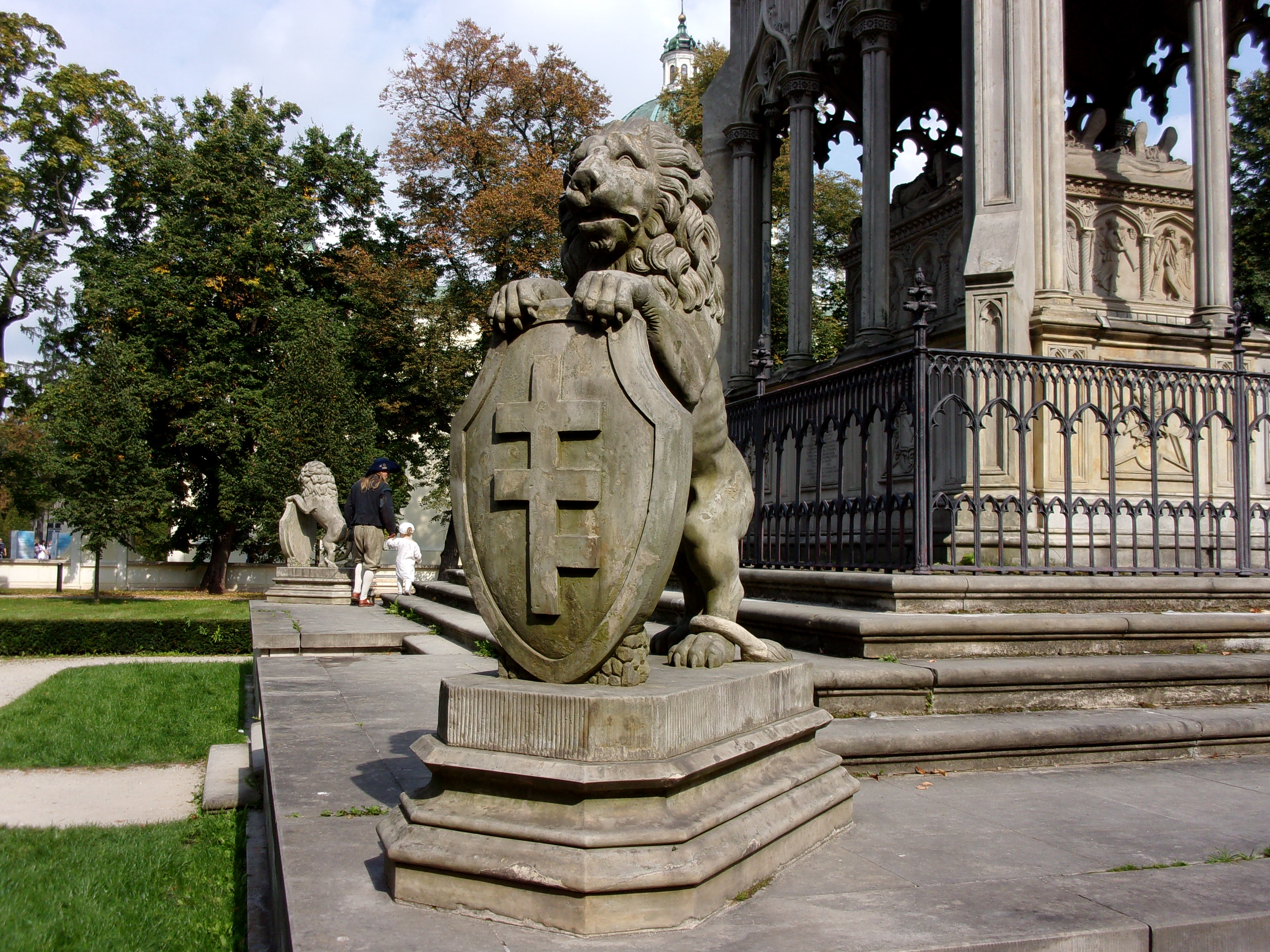
One of the sandstone statues of lions with the Pilawa coat of arms.

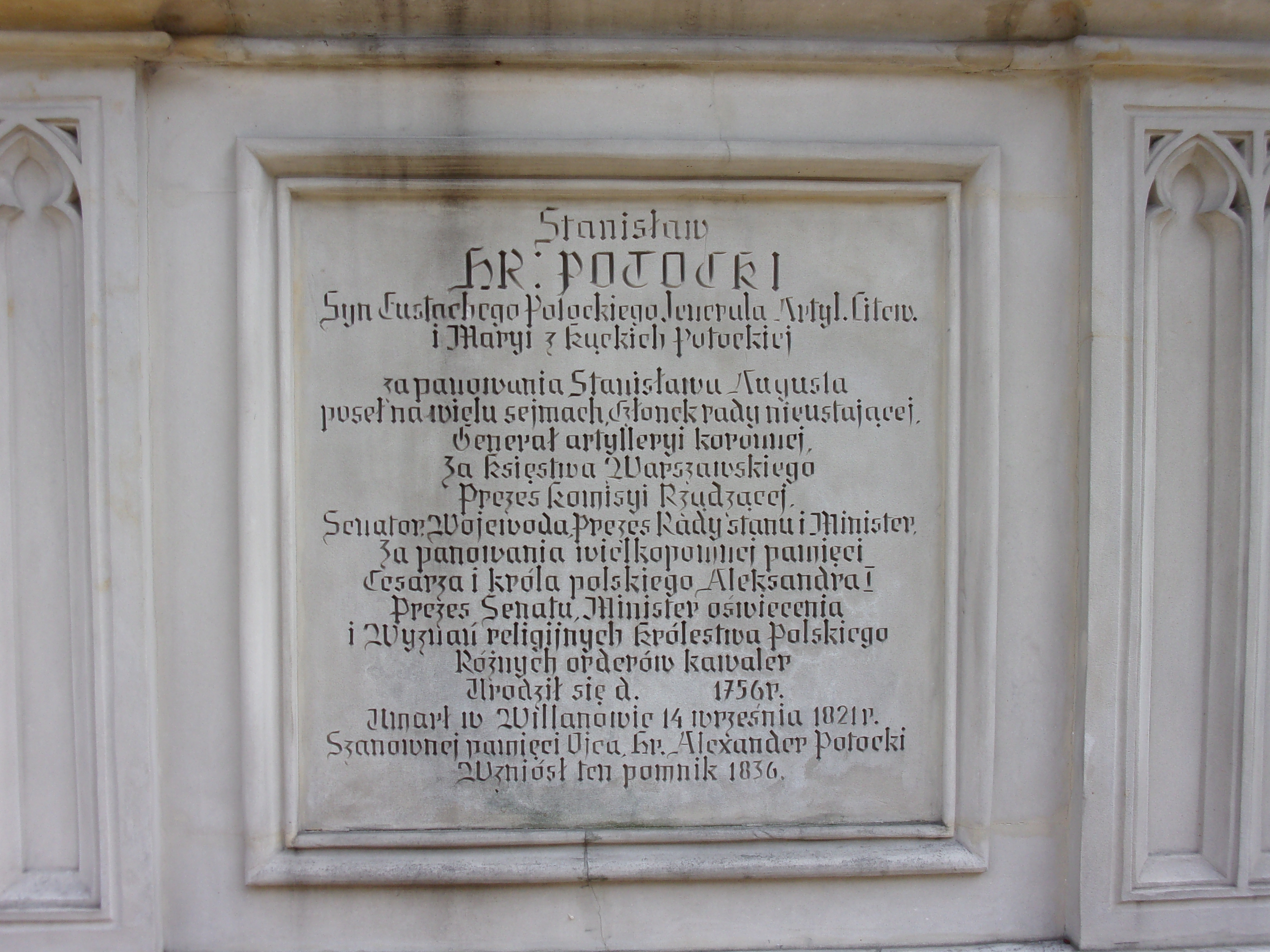
An inscription on a sarcophagus, dedicated to Stanisław Kostka Potocki.

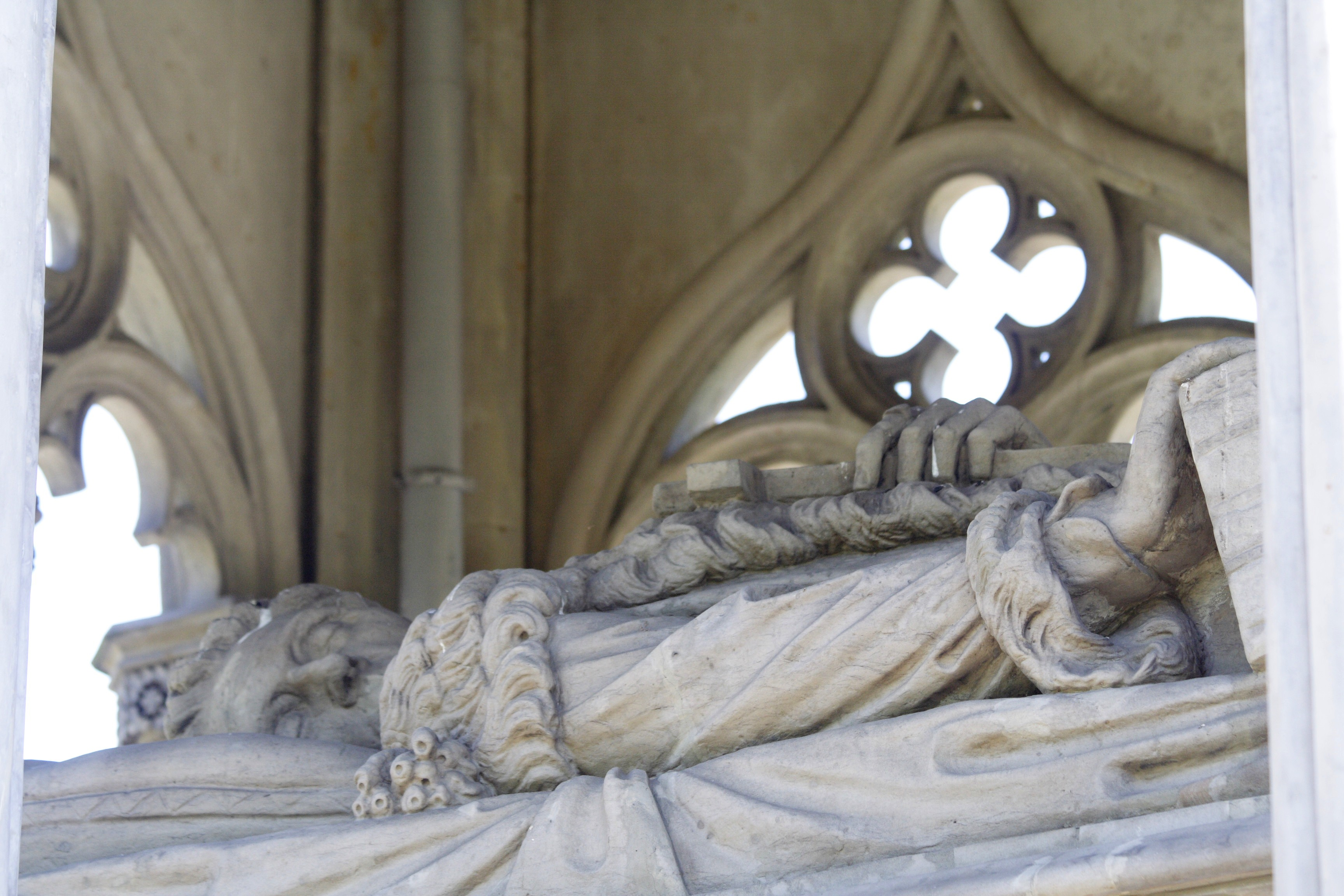
A relief depicting Stanisław Kostka Potocki and Aleksandra Potocka.

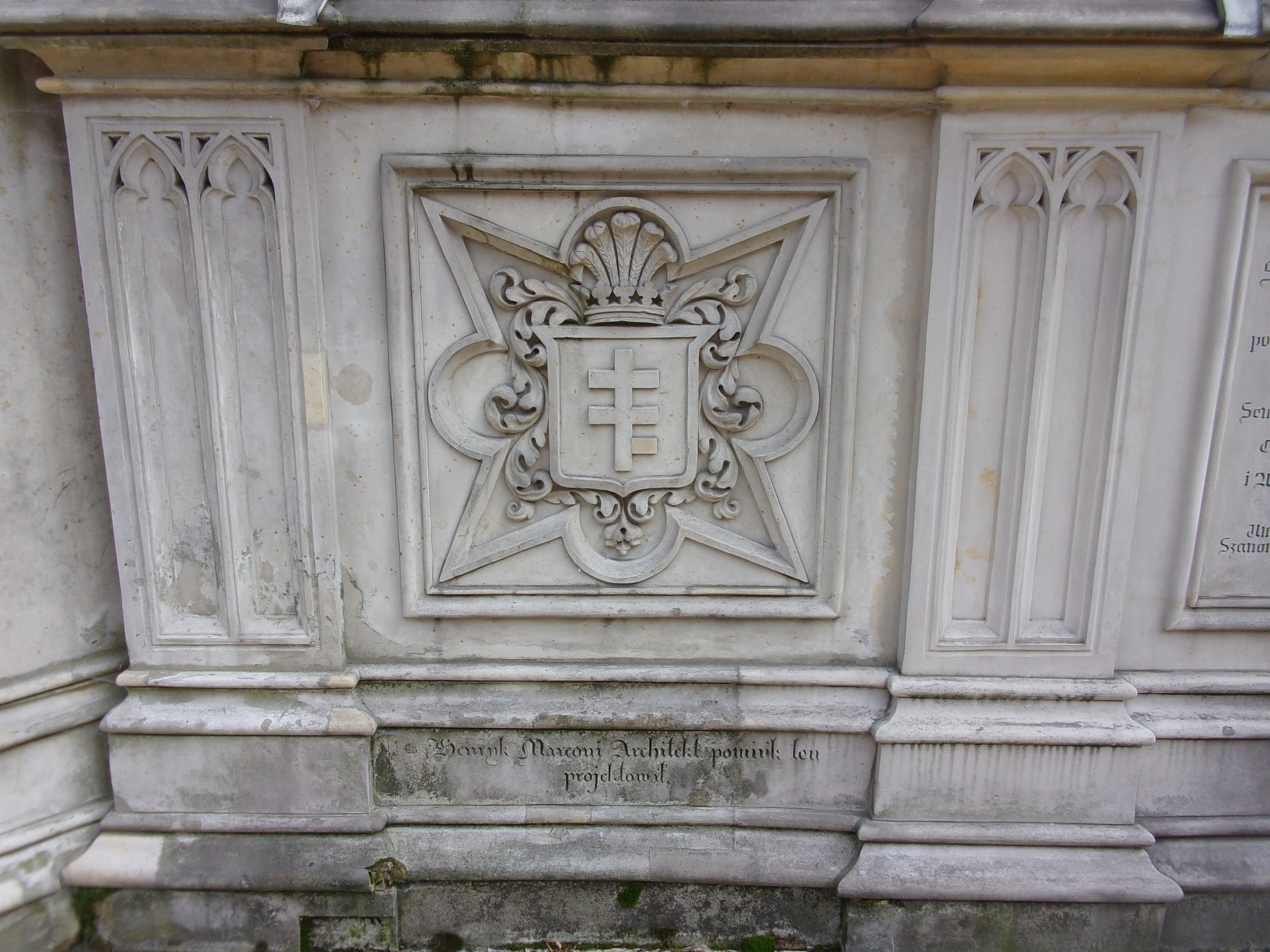
The Pilawa coat of arms on the façade.

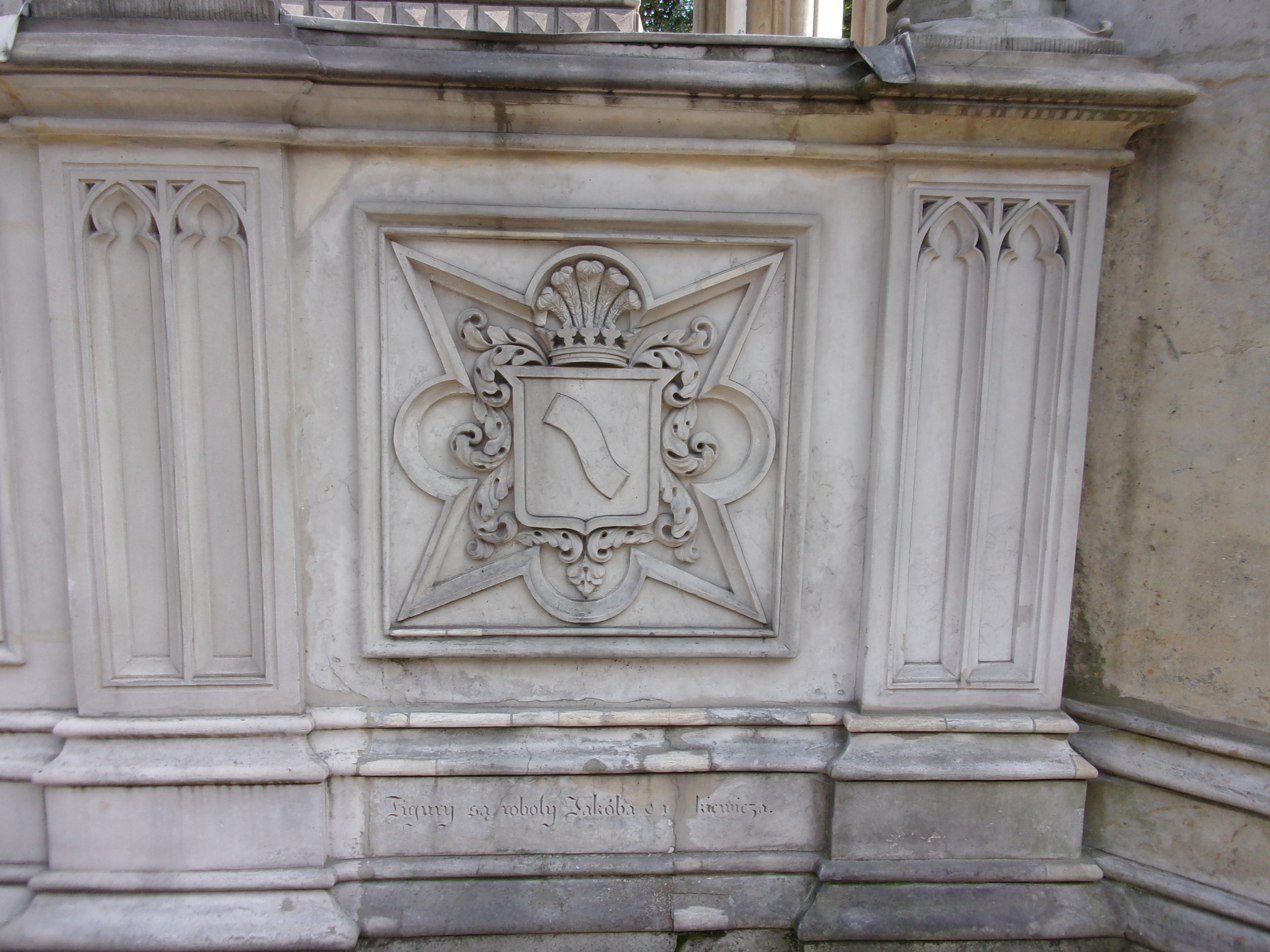
The Drużyna coat of arms on the façade.
