= Stanisław Lubomirski (1722–1782) =

Polish nobleman

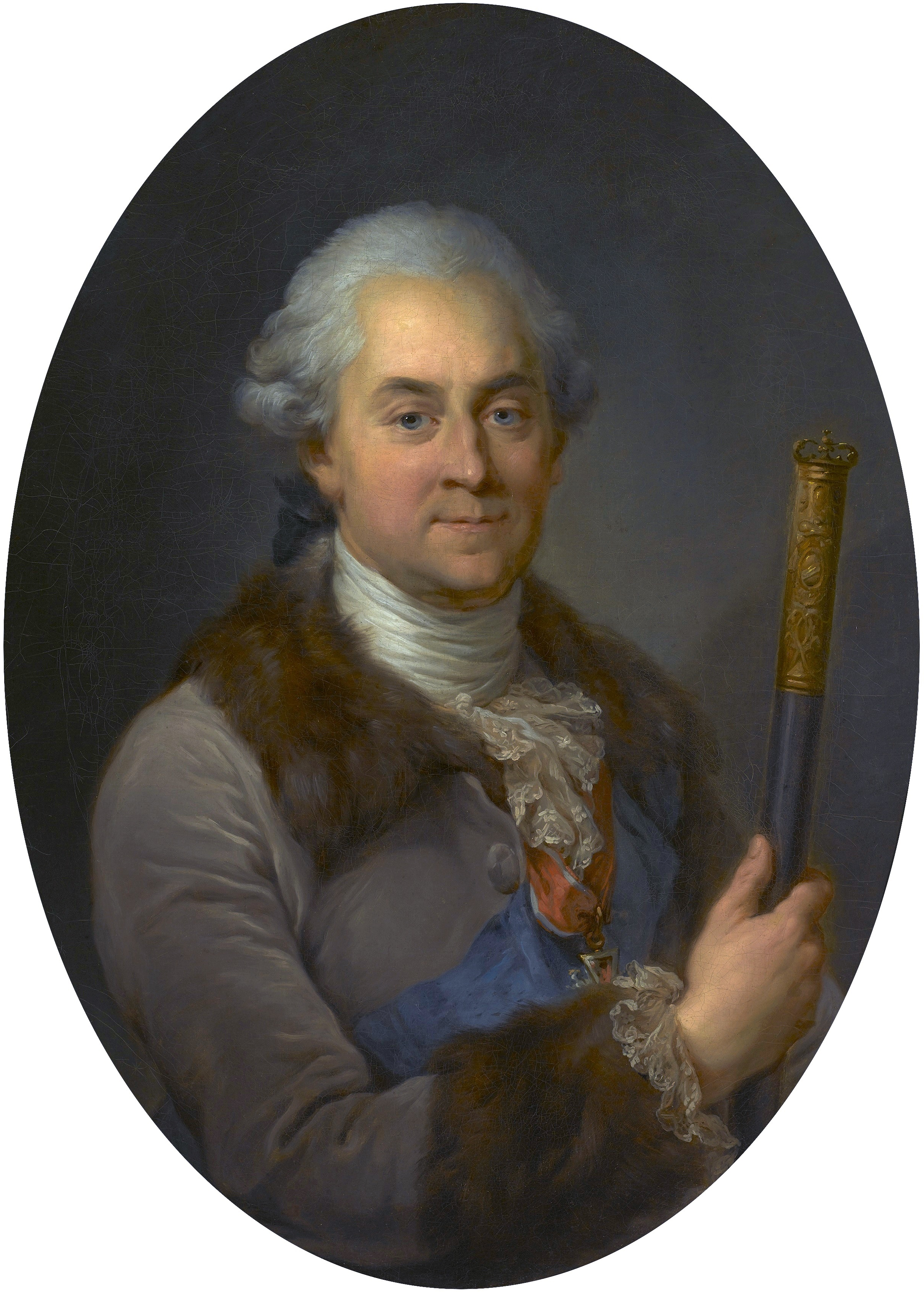
- Coat of arms: Szreniawa bez Krzyża
- Born: 25 December 1722; Kraków
- Died: 12 August 1782 (aged 59); Łańcut
- Noble family: Lubomirski
- Spouse: Elżbieta Czartoryska
- Issue: Elżbieta Lubomirska; Julia Lubomirska; Aleksandra Lubomirska; Konstancja Małgorzata Lubomirska
- Father: Józef Lubomirski
- Mother: Teresa Mniszech

Prince Stanisław Lubomirski (25 December 1722 in Kraków – 12 August 1782 in Łańcut) was a Polish nobleman. He was awarded Knight of the Order of the White Eagle on 3 August 1757 in Warsaw, and later was also awarded the Order of Saint Stanislaus.

He was the Crown Grand Warden from 1752, onward, the Crown Grand Marshal starting in 1766. He was the commissioner of the knighthood of the Crown Treasury Commission in 1765, the counselor of the Permanent Council in 1780, the starosta of Wiślica in 1765, the starosta of Kałusz, starosta of Goszczyń and starosta of Lubochnia.

He married Princess Elżbieta Izabela Czartoryska 9 June 1753. They had four children: Elżbieta Lubomirska, Julia Lubomirska, Aleksandra Lubomirska and Konstancja Małgorzata Lubomirska. His properties included Lubomirski Palace in Lwów, Lubomirski Palace in Łańcut, and the vast estates of Wiśnicz and Przeworsk. He is also the namesake for Warsaw's Lubomirski Ramparts.

== Life ==
Stanisław Lubomirski was the son of Józef Lubomirski, voivode of Czerniaków, and Teresa Mniszchówna. His brother was Antoni, castellan and voivode of Kraków.

He was a member of parliament (Sejm) between 1746 and 1762. Through his life he was one of the members of the prominent political group Familia.

With his wealth he constantly supported the political interests of the Familia. He played the major role of one of the leaders of the Czartoryski camp (he married Elżbieta, daughter of August Aleksander Czartoryski). His daughters were Julia Potocka, Konstancja Rzewuska, Elżbieta Izabela Potocka and Aleksandra Potocka. Later, he was an implacable enemy of the last king of Poland - Stanisław II August. Meritorious for the development of Warsaw, he fought against Russian influence in Poland.

For the first time he was a deputy (poseł) from the Sandomierz voivodeship to the Sejm of 1746. To the Sejm in 1748 he was chosen as a Crown envoy from Livonia. He was elected again in 1756, again from the Sandomierz powiat of the Sandomierz voivodeship. In 1758 he was chosen as a deputy to the Sejm once more. In 1758 he reactivated the Polish Masonic Lodge - "Trzech Braci" - Three Brothers. Member of the Extraordinary Sejm of 1761 from the Sandomierz Province. On 29 April 1761 he broke up the extraordinary parliament with liberum veto. In 1762 he was chosen as a Member of Parliament from the Sandomierz again, and in 1764 he was the deputy from Sandomierz to the Royal election, where he played a major role as one of the initiators of the reforms of the state.

He was the marshal of the Sandomierz voivodeship in the Czartoryski confederation in 1764. In 1764 he was one the electors of Stanisław August Poniatowski from the Sandomierz Province. In 1766 he was once again chosen as a deputy from his province. Having received the marshal's staff in 1766, he was one of the contributed to modernize and expand the capital city of Warsaw, and worked on the reform of the criminal justice system. During the Bar Confederation, he tried to influence strengthen the king in resistance towards Russia, trying to win him over to the side of the Confederates and France. He was a member of the confederation of 1773. As a member of the delegation to the Partition Sejm 1773–1775, he was a representative of the opposition. However, on 18 September 1773 he signed treaties of cession by the Polish–Lithuanian Commonwealth of the lands seized by Russia, Prussia and Austria in the first partition of Poland.

After the first partition, he belonged to the magnate opposition trying to ally with Austria. Openly acting against the king, he received a seat in the Permanent Council. There, he was a Member of the Police Department of the Council in 1779.

He donated funds to the astronomical observatory built by Nathanael Matthaeus von Wolf in Gdańsk (Danzig).
