= Józef Lubomirski =

Polish noble (c. 1676 – 1732)

- Prince
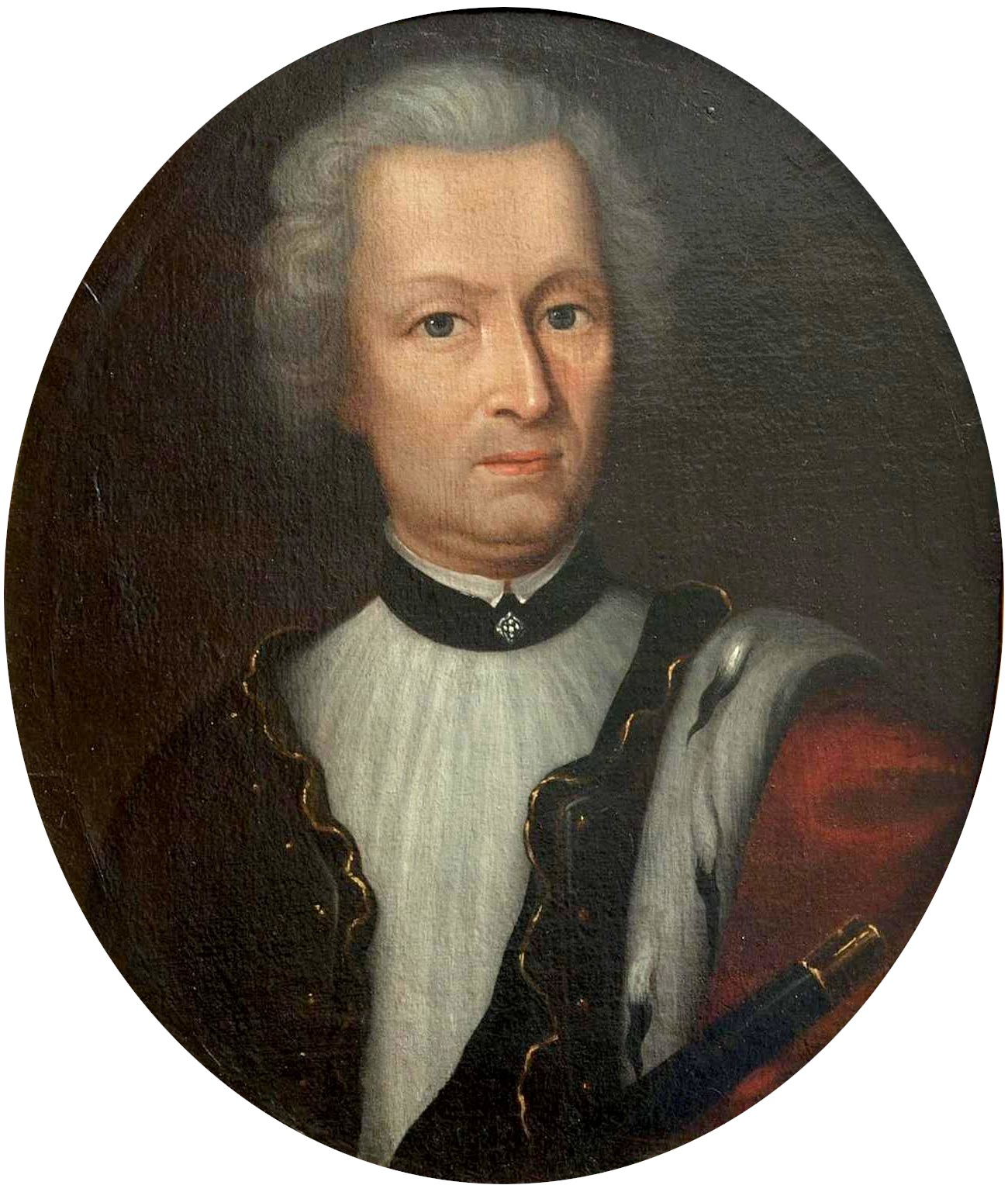

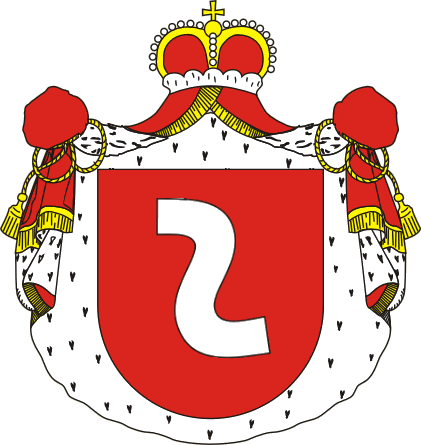
- Coat of arms: Lubomirski
- Born: c. 1676
- Died: 1732
- Family: Lubomirski
- Consort: Katarzyna Bełżecka; Teresa Mniszech
- Issue: with Teresa Mniszech; Anna Lubomirska; Antoni Lubomirski; Stanisław Lubomirski
- Father: Stanisław Herakliusz Lubomirski
- Mother: Elzbieta Denhoff

Prince Józef Lubomirski (c. 1676 – 1732) was a Polish noble (szlachcic). He was voivode of Chernigov Voivodeship since 1726.
