= Konstancja Małgorzata Lubomirska =

Polish noblewoman (1761–1840)

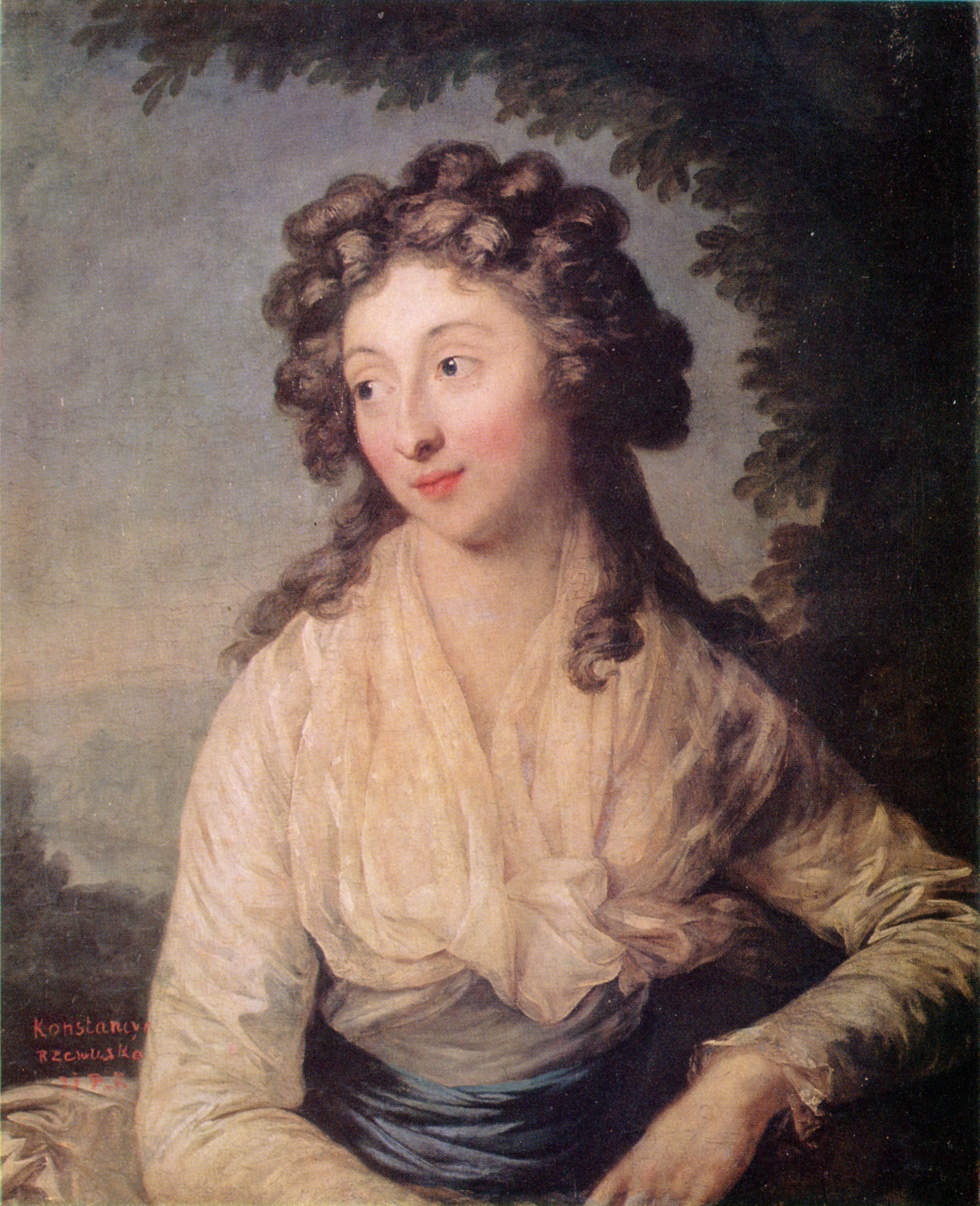
- Portrait by Anton Graff, 1789
- Coat of arms: Lubomirski
- Born: 1761; Valley
- Died: 11 October 1840 (aged 78–79); Kamieniec
- Family: Lubomirski
- Spouse: Seweryn Rzewuski
- Issue: Waclaw Rzewuski; Izabella Rzewuska; Maria Rzewuska
- Father: Stanisław Lubomirski
- Mother: Elżbieta Czartoryska

Princess Konstancja Małgorzata Lubomirska (1761–1840) was a Polish noblewoman and artist. She was an amateur artist and some of her drawings are preserved.

She married Seweryn Rzewuski in 1782.
