= Paweł Maliński =

Polish sculptor and woodcarver

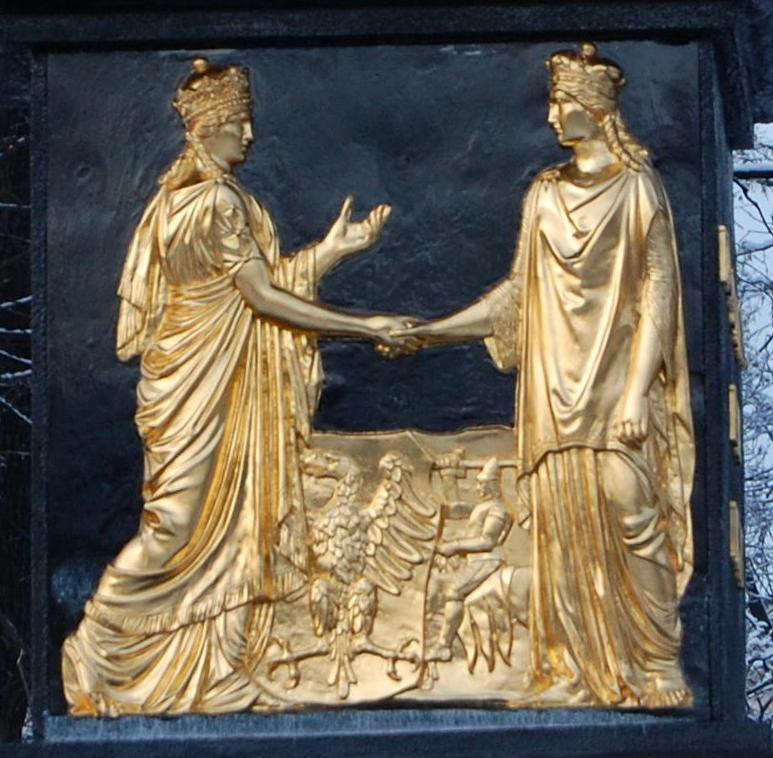
Bas-relief on the monument of the Union of Lublin, Lublin, representing the Crown and Lithuania, by Paweł Maliński

Paweł Maliński (1790-1853) was a Bohemia-born sculptor and mason.

== Training ==
Maliński was born in Berniau, Bohemia, Holy Roman Empire. In 1804 he enrolled at the Academy of Fine Arts, Prague. In the years 1810-1816 he studied at the Dresden Academy of Fine Arts under the direction of the sculptor Franz Pettrich. Maliński made architectural sculptures adorning the facades and interiors of buildings and churches, statues, tombstones and portraits generally maintained in the neoclassical style.

== Career ==
In 1816, he arrived in Warsaw at the invitation of Stanisław Zamoyski, who entrusted him with the execution of the sculptural decoration for rebuilding the Blue Palace. In 1817 he was appointed a professor of sculpture at the University of Warsaw. He held this position until the closure of the Department of Fine Arts after the fall of the November Uprising. In the years 1820-1822 he went on a government scholarship to Italy, where he spent two years (1820-1822) he worked under the direction of Bertel Thorvaldsen. Maliński developed including such students as Konstanty Hegel, Władysław Oleszczyński, and Jakub Tatarkiewicz.
