= Łańcut Castle =

Historic building in Poland

Coordinates: 50°04′07″N 22°14′05″E

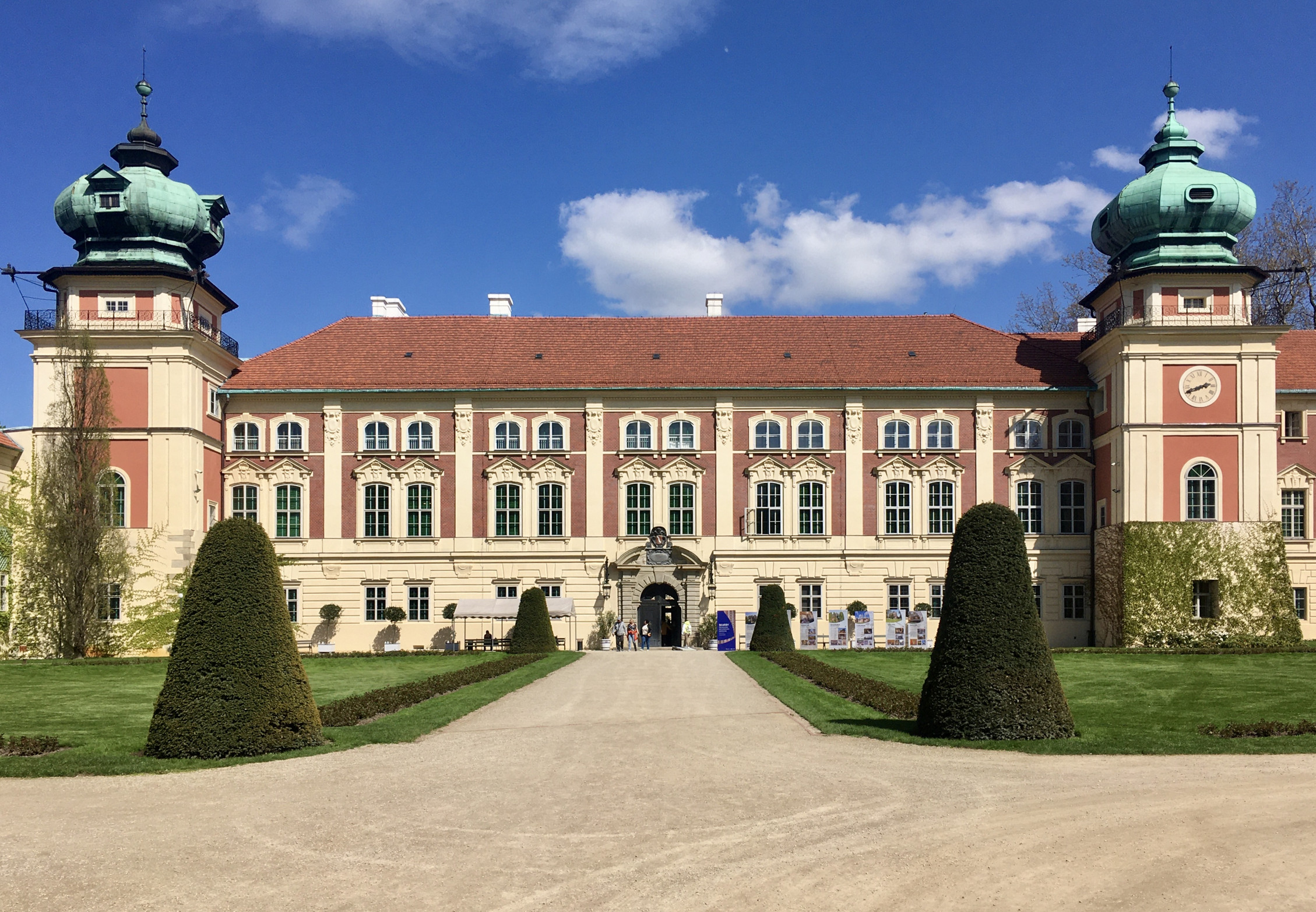
- Castle façade
- Interactive map of the Łańcut Castle area

General information
- Architectural style: Baroque
- Location: Łańcut, Łańcut County, Subcarpathian Voivodeship, Poland
- Construction started: 1629
- Completed: 1642
- Client: Stanisław Lubomirski

Design and construction
- Architects: Maciej Trapola, Krzysztof Mieroszewski, Tylman Gamerski

Łańcut Castle (Polish: Zamek w Łańcucie; pronounced: [ˈwaɲt͡sut]) is a complex of historical buildings located in Łańcut, Subcarpathian Voivodeship, Poland. Historically the residence of the Pilecki, Lubomirski and Potocki families, the complex includes a number of buildings and is surrounded by a park. The castle is one of Poland's official national Historic Monuments (Pomnik historii), as designated September 1, 2005, and tracked by the National Heritage Board of Poland.

== Owners ==
In the second half of the 14th century, the land was the property of the Toporczyk family, who built a wooden castle on the hill. In the 16th century the castle belonged to the Stadnicki family. From the 17th century, the property was in the hands of the Lubomirski family, and then the Potocki family until 1944.

== History ==
The castle was originally built in the second half of the 16th century, but was later modernised into a palace-residence by its owners. It was once home to two of Poland’s most prominent families: first the Lubomirski family, until 1816, and later the Potocki family, until 1944.

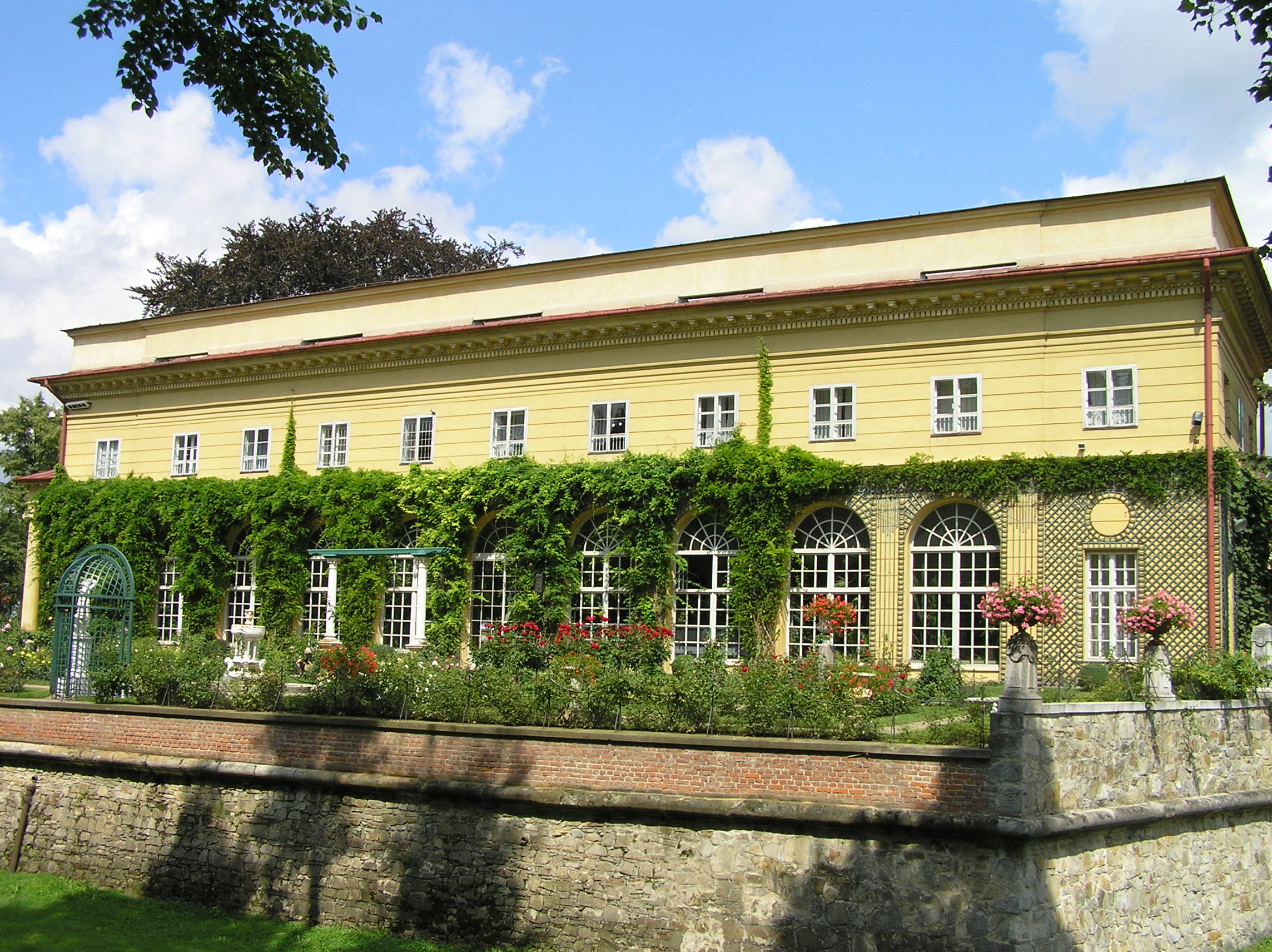
The orangery and fortifications

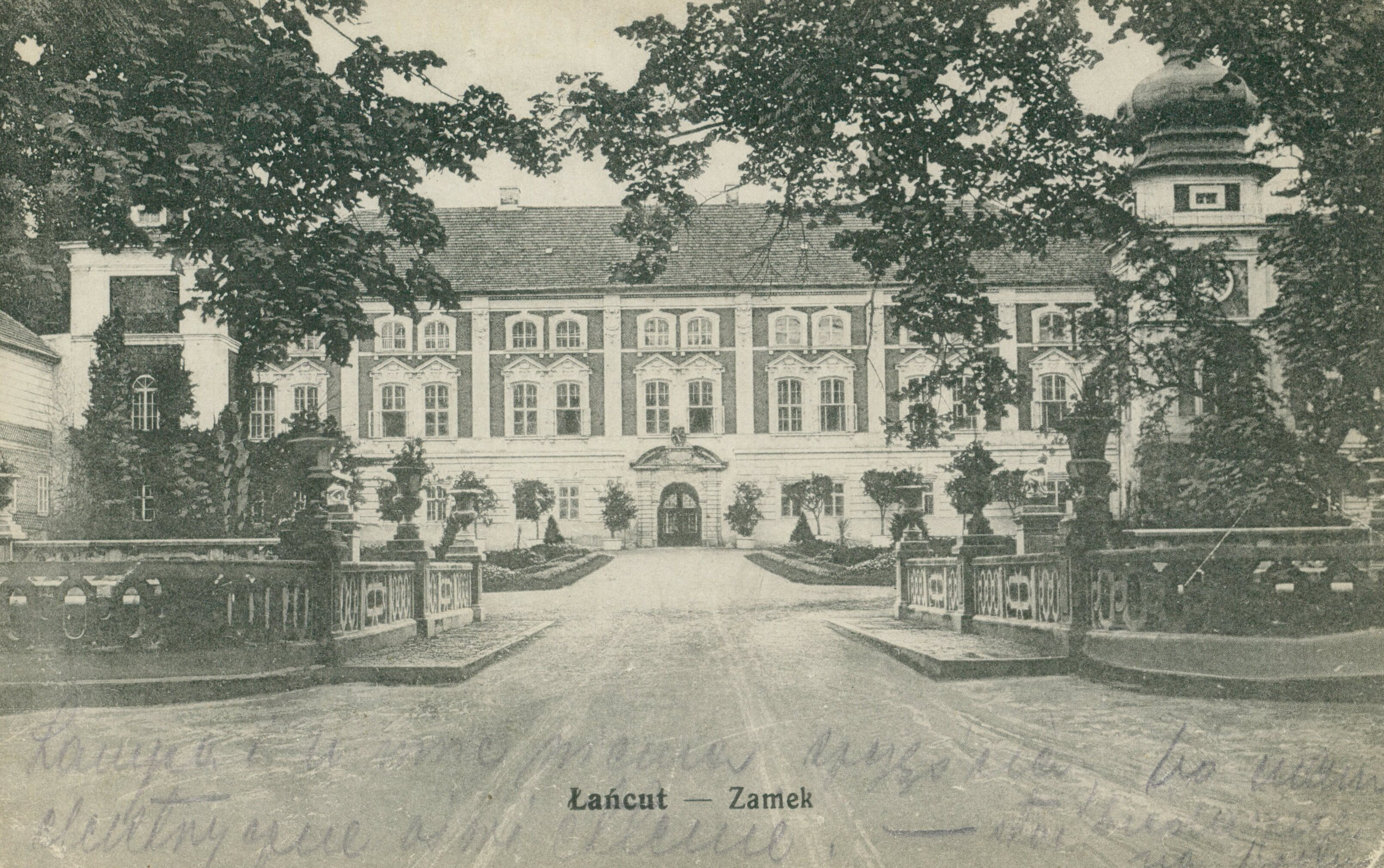
The castle ca 1915

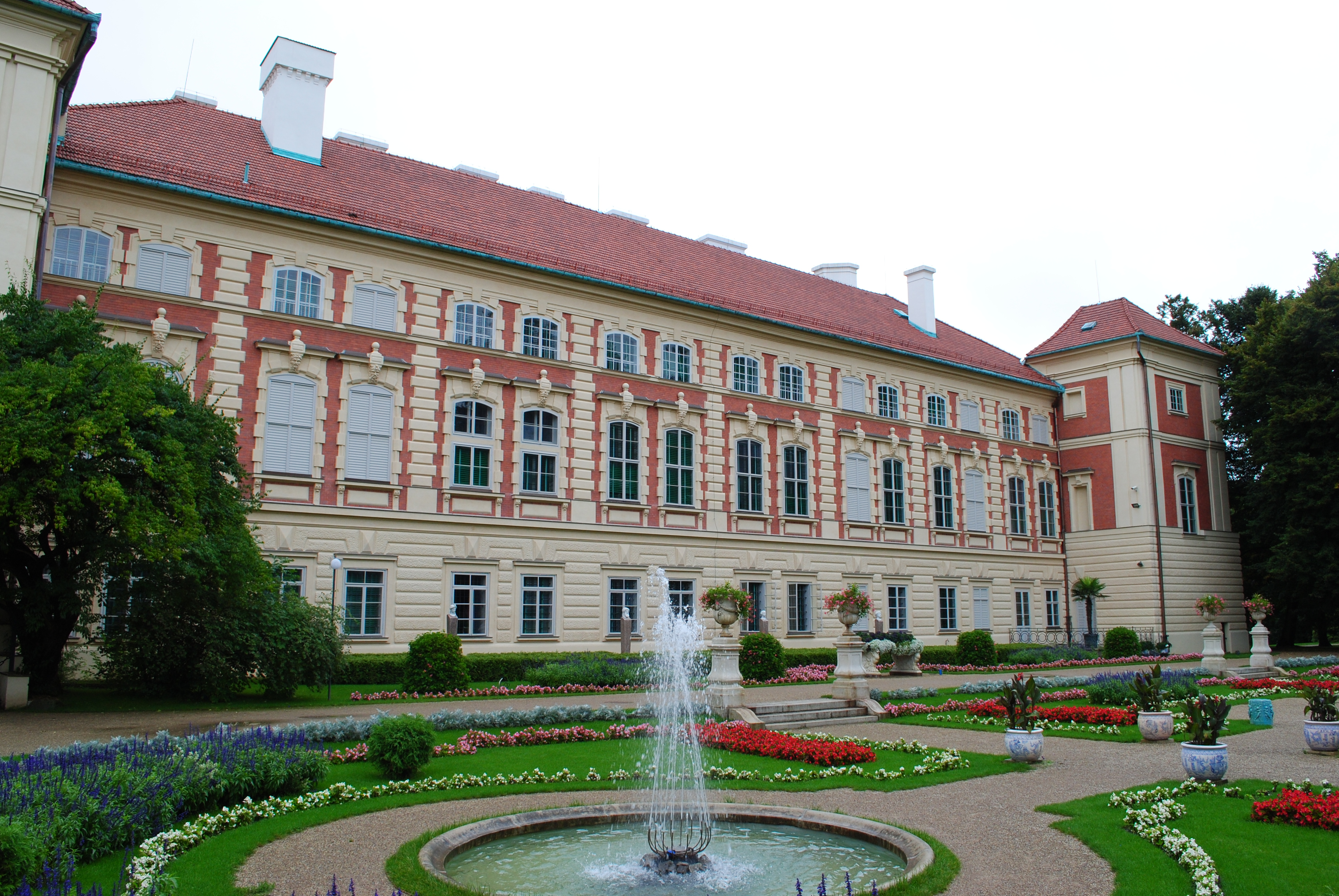
Italian garden

The history of Łańcut is much older than the castle erected in 1642. It goes back to the times of King Casimir III the Great, who founded here a town in accordance with the Magdeburg Rights in the 14th century. At the time Łańcut was owned by the Pilecki family, who had connections with the royal Jagiellonian Dynasty. The head of the family, Otton Pilecki, was a close friend of the king and his wife, Jadwiga, became the godmother to the future successor, Władysław II Jagiełło (1352–1434). Later the connections were strengthened with their daughter Elżbieta's marriage to the king. Władysław II Jagiełło is believed to have visited Łańcut twice. Between World War I and World War II, the local townspeople still pointed to a lime tree growing on a hill, a former site of the Pilecki's wooden fortified mansion, where the king was believed to have relaxed with his third wife Elżbieta. After the Pilecki clan had died out, Łańcut became the property of the Stadnicki family. The most famous of them was Stanisław, the governor of Sigulda. Stadnicki extended and modernised the castle in 1610 during the reign of Sigismund III.

In 1629, Łańcut became the property of Stanisław Lubomirski, governor of Ruthenia and Count of Wiśnicz, who in 1647 became the prince of the Holy Roman Empire. It was Lubomirski who erected, according to Maciej Trapola's design, the quadrilateral castle with corner donjons surrounded by fortifications. Other traces of Lubomirski's restructuring include parts of the castle fortification, presumably the work of Krzysztof Mieroszewski (1600–1679).

During the Swedish invasion of Poland, in 1656, the castle was visited by King John II Casimir (1609–1672). In 1657, it was unsuccessfully besieged by the Swedish ally, George II Rákóczi. In the late 17th century, after the 1688 fire, Stanisław Lubomirski hired Tylman van Gameren, a Dutch-born Polish architect and engineer, who restored the castle. Tylman left behind a lifelong legacy of buildings that are regarded as gems of Polish Baroque architecture. In Łańcut he transformed the former castle into a palace, simultaneously adding bulbous cupolas to the side towers, which are the most characteristic aspect of the castle's architecture. Lubomirski also employed Italian architect Giovanni Battista Falconi, who was in charge of the interior decoration.

The baroque palazzo in fortezza in Łańcut underwent its first radical alterations in the late 18th and early 19th centuries. Its owners at the time were Duke Stanisław Lubomirski (1722–1782) and his wife Izabela Czartoryska. Initial transformations were conducted by the Lubomirskis together and after her husband's death in 1783, the Duchess continued the work by herself. She also began to expand the complex and, being a great admirer of baroque architecture, continued to transform the castle into a palace. She employed prominent artists such as Szymon Bogumił Zug, Jan Christian Kamsetzer, Chrystian Piotr Aigner, Fryderyk Bauman and Vincenzo Brenna.

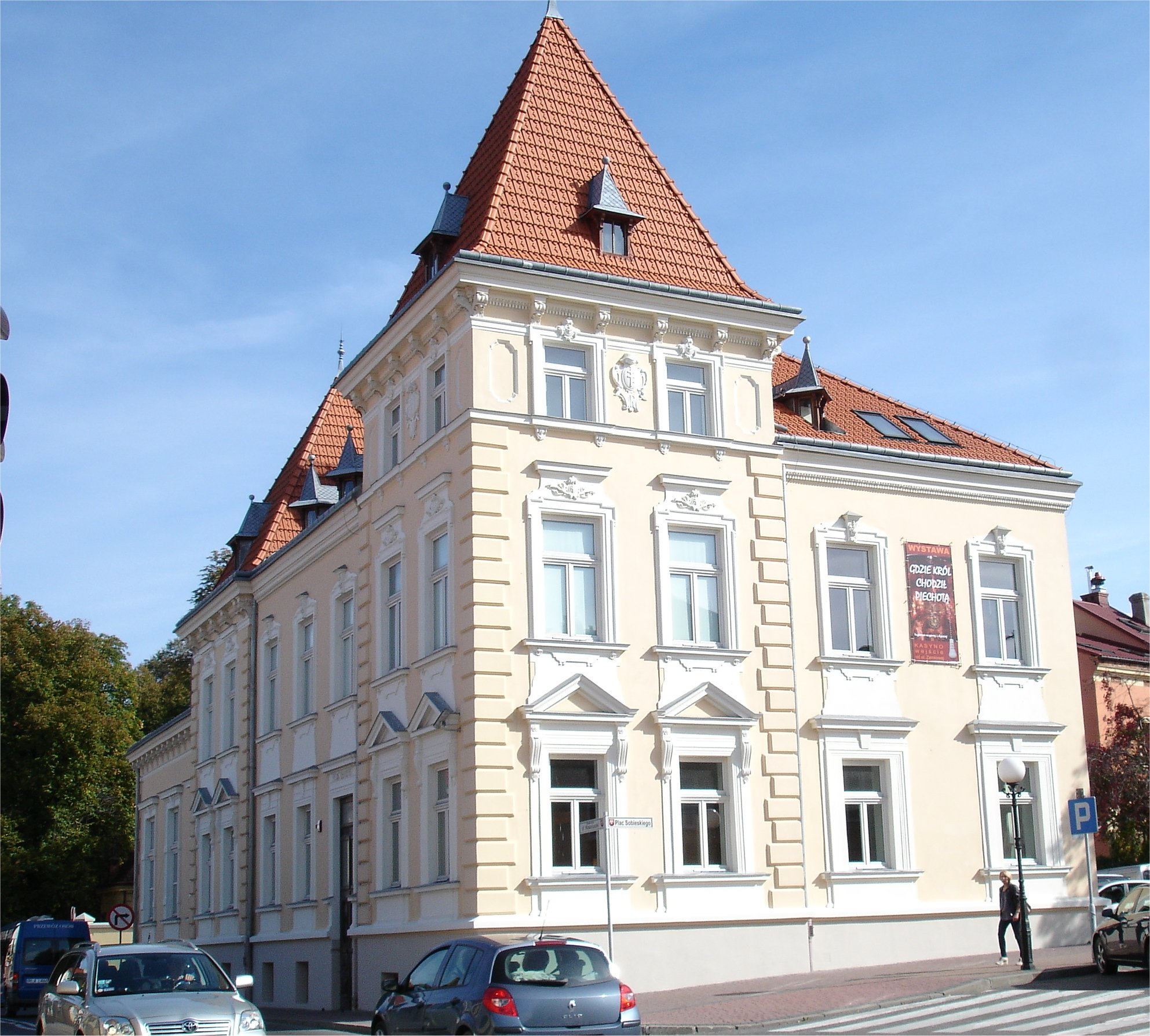
Historical casino which once was part of the estate

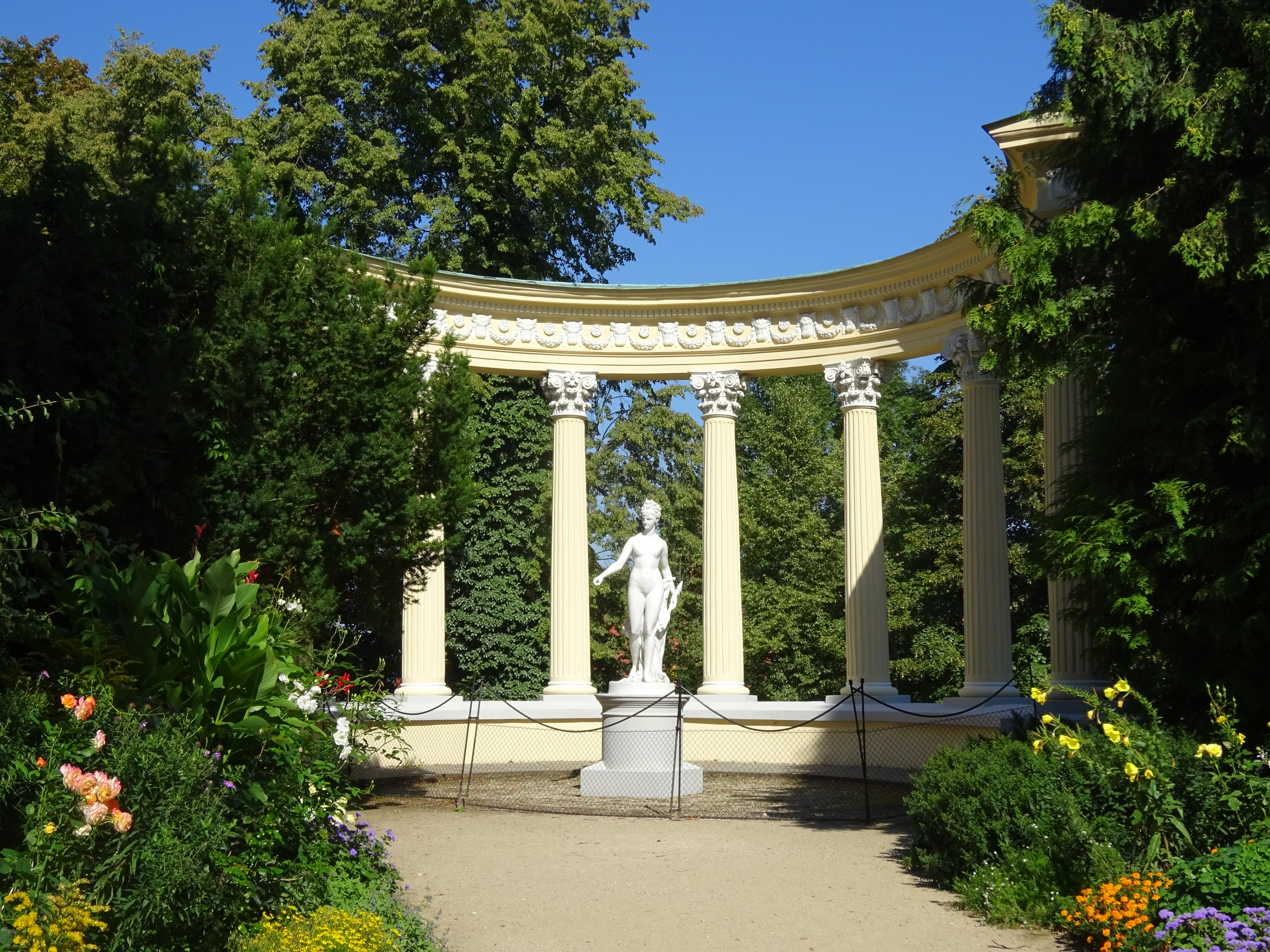
Gloriette of the Łańcut Castle

Following Izabela's death in 1816, Łańcut was inherited by her grandchildren and members of the Potocki family. For the next one hundred years, the castle became the centre of their hereditary family estate, legally established in 1830. Successive generations of the Potockis introduced various levels of modernisation both in the castle itself and its immediate and more distant surrounding. The Duchess' grandson and heir, conducted some repairs in the castle, but most importantly he erected a complex of horse-riding facilities consisting of stables and three carriage houses

The most radical changes in the estate and the whole surrounding, were introduced during the times of the Duchess' great-great-grandson – Roman Potocki, who married Elżbieta née Radziwiłł. They carried out a major overhaul and rearrangement of the large Łańcut estate, at the same time providing the 17th-century structure with electricity, water pipes, sewers, and central airflow heating. In 1880 the castle also received a telephone connection with the hunters' palace in Julin, located several kilometres away.

Roman and Elżbieta Potocki hired a French architect, Amand Louis Bauqué, and a graphic designer Albert Pio, who worked on new stylistic transformations and arrangement of the residence. The old Neo-Gothic decorations on the castle frontage were replaced by the Neo-Baroque ornamentation. The most radical changes were introduced in the horse-riding complex, dating from the first half of the 19th century. Only the manege was left unchanged. However the classicist stable houses were demolished and replaced with new, Neo-Baroque stables designed by Bauqué. Ten years later, in 1902, the new carriage house with a large harnessing hall was built.

Nowadays, Łańcut Castle is considered one of the greatest aristocratic residences in Poland. It continues to fascinate with its impressive architecture, magnificent interiors and rich art collections. Surrounded with a spacious and enchanting park, it is a place transformed into a museum, which most fully shows the royal splendour of aristocratic households, the charm of the world which in Poland was ended by the Second World War and its political outcome.

== Styles and interior ==
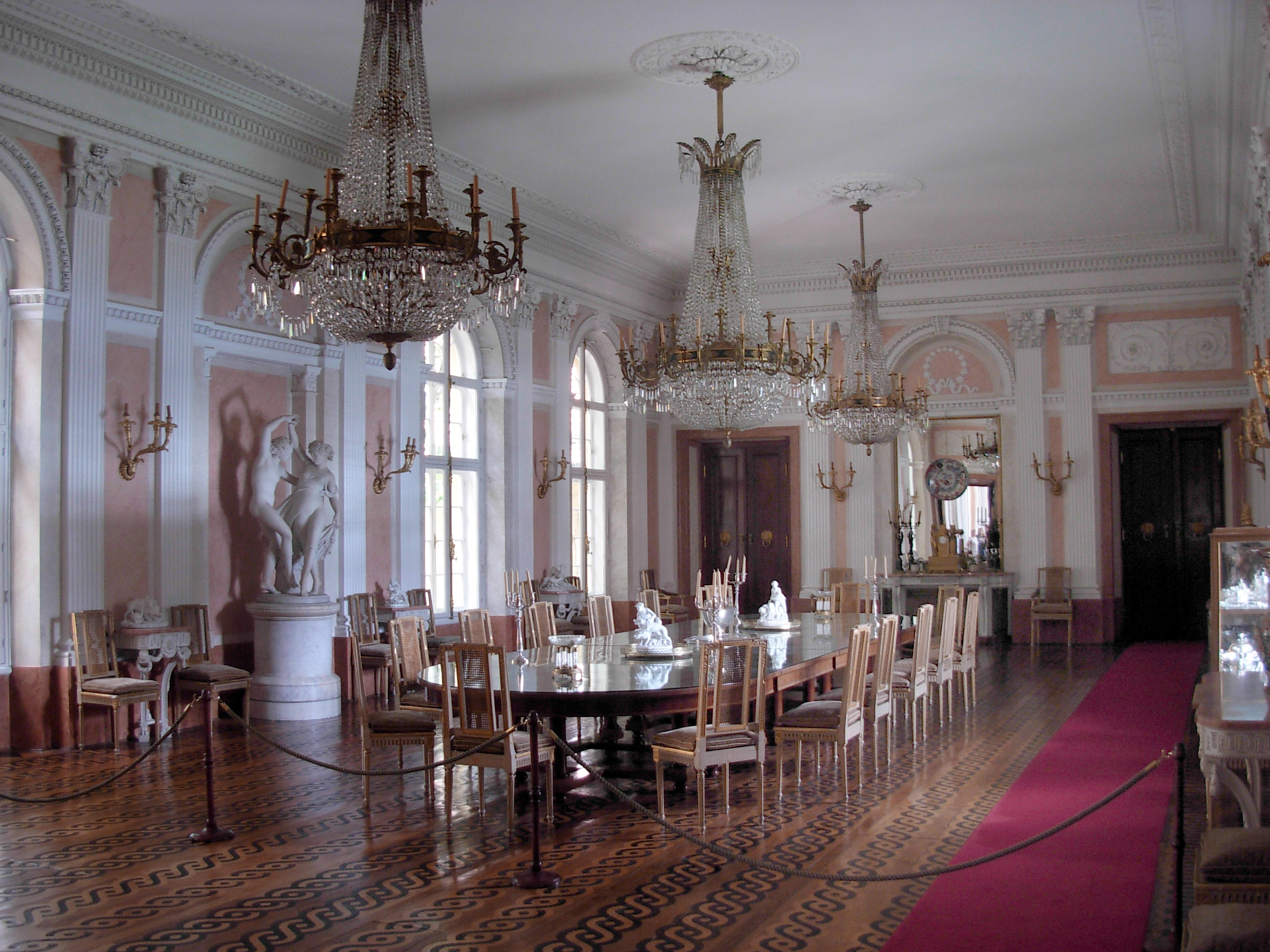
The Great Dining Room inside the castle

Artists and architects who worked in Łańcut incorporated a variety of styles in the architecture of the castle. The lush classicist stucco works, which can still be seen today were made by Fryderyk Bauman. Apart from classicist, also rococo and Neo-Gothic decorative elements were created. Some made clear reference to the Orient and pre-romantic trends. The castle also received an impressive collection of paintings and sculptures purchased mainly during numerous trips made by the couple and later by the Duchess, who was very creative and constantly looking for artistic inspirations. In fact, even today, in spite of all the later alterations and modernisations, the castle largely retains the character which it received in the course of the few decades, until Duchess Izabela Lubomirska's death in 1816.

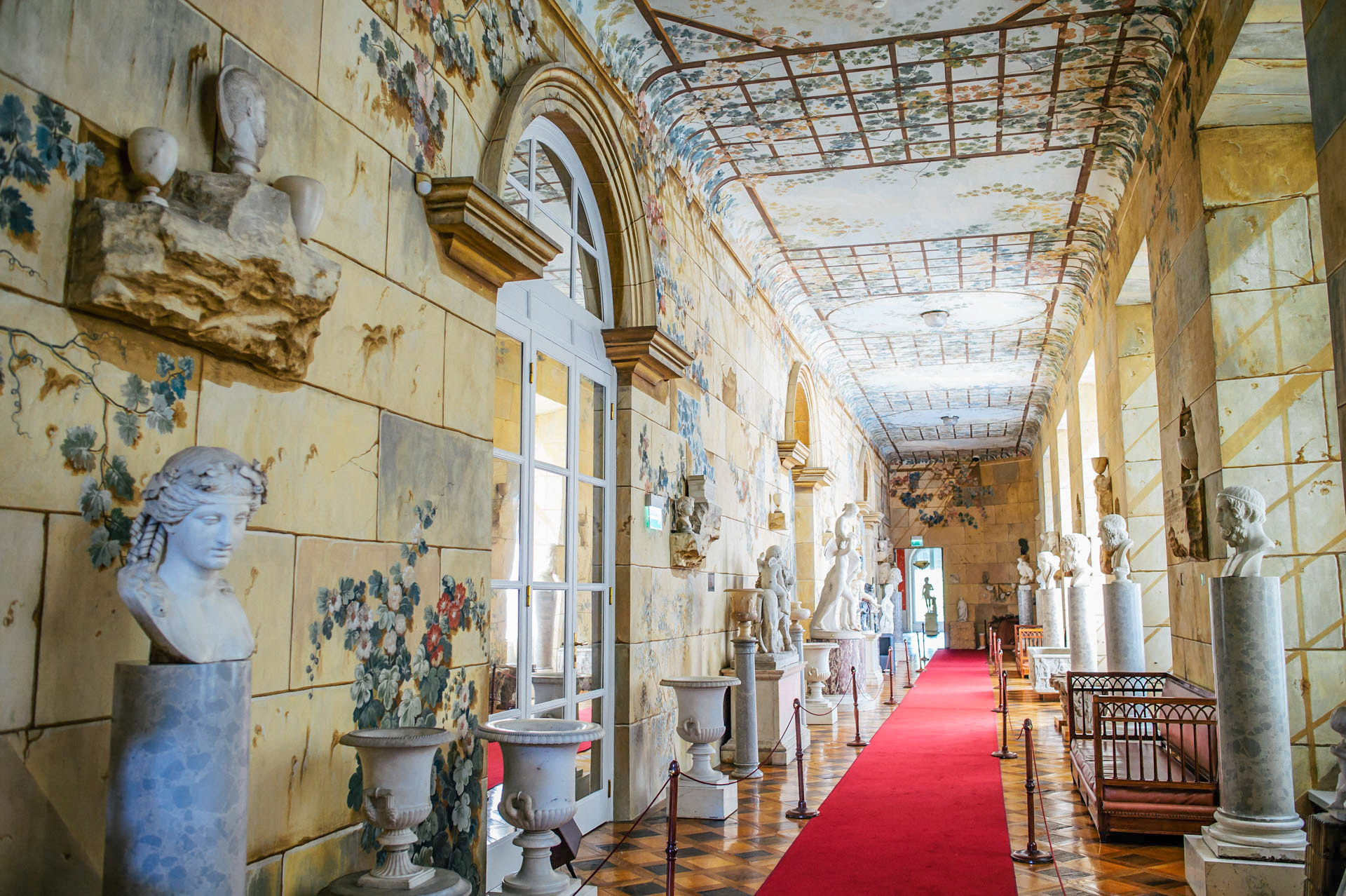
Artworks displayed inside the castle.

The castle's interior features several rooms designed for her. For instance, on the ground floor, the oriental style of the Turkish Apartment was arranged in the old 17th-century vaulted chambers; the refined elegance of the View Room decorated with arabesques; and the intimacy of the Brenna Apartment which looks like a white-green vanity box. The reception rooms created on the first floor constitute several sequences. Private suites in the northern wing consist of bedrooms, dressing rooms and two salons. One of them, called the Mirror Salon, is ornamented with a valuable rococo boiserie featuring magnificent polychrome wood-carvings depicting symbols of the four seasons.

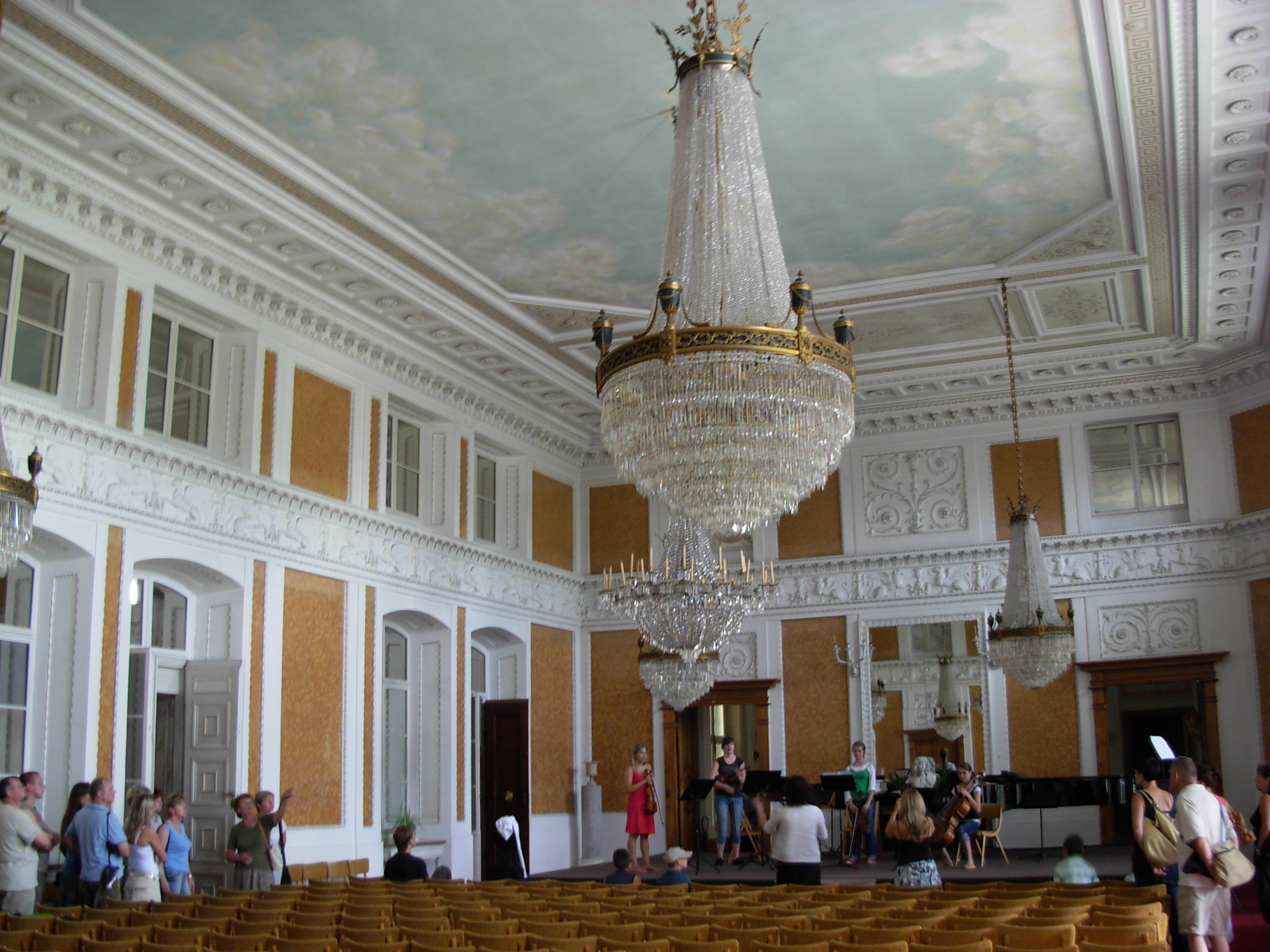
One of the chambers decorated with paintings and chandeliers

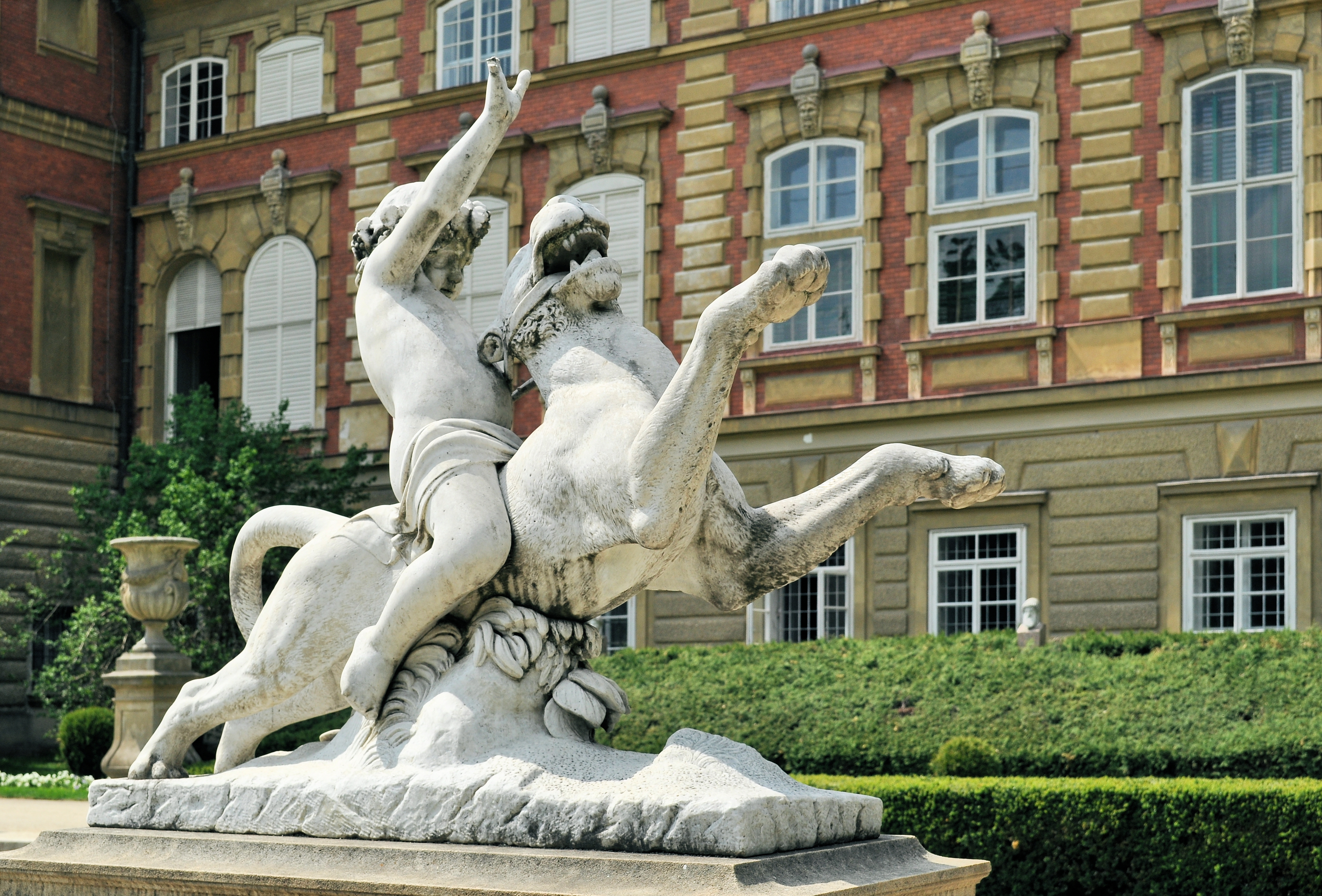
The statue of Bacchus on the panther

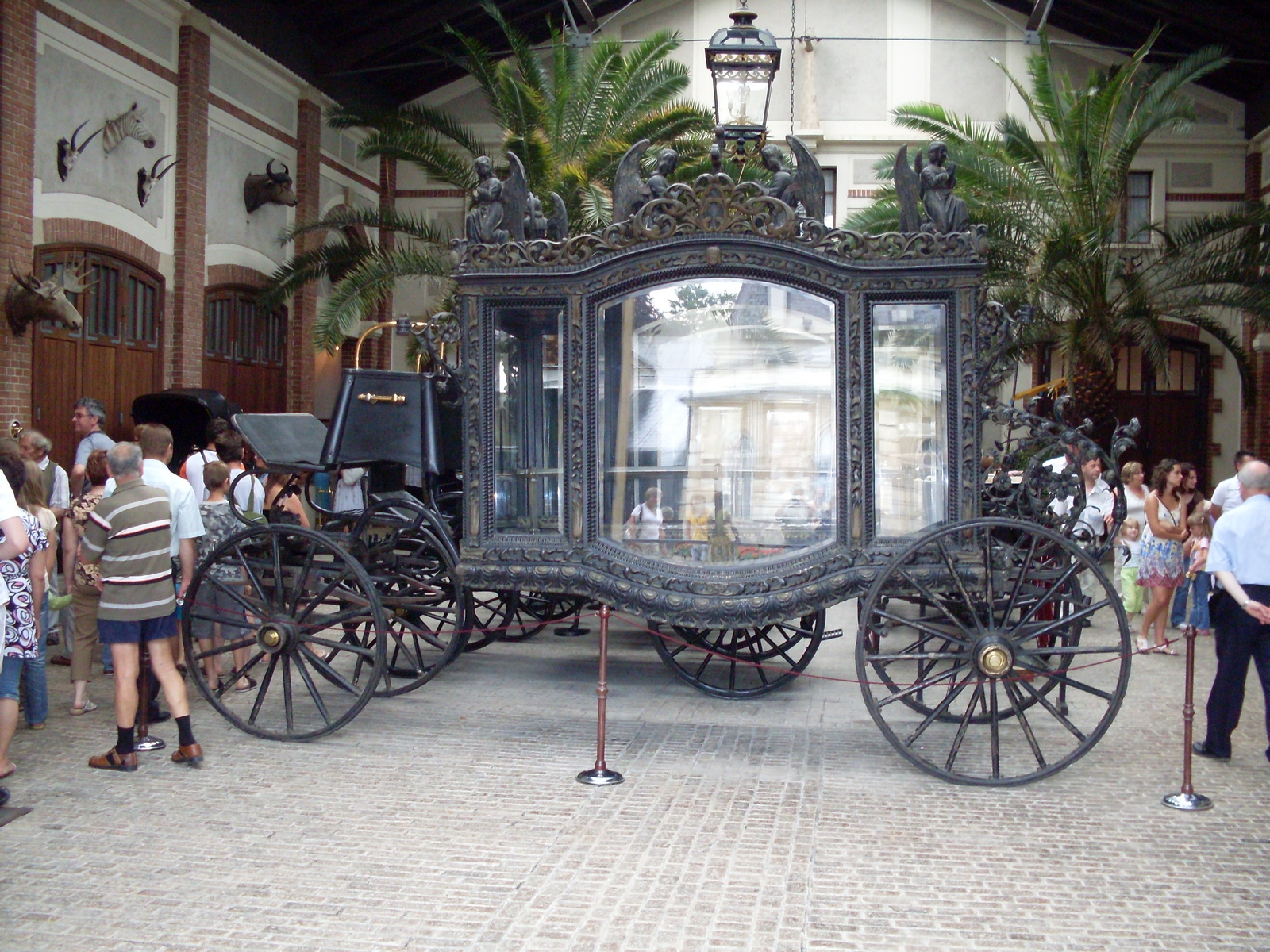
The palace's collection of historical carriages

The bedroom and another salon, which later received the name Boucher Salon, are classicist rooms which were specially designed for the Duchess, and both feature magnificent wood-carved overdoors. The bedroom walls are decorated with colorful fabric featuring the pattern described in an old inventory as "flames and flowers". It also forms a baldachin over the bed. The material which can be seen today is the third version of the design. The first one, made of silk and dating from the times of the Duchess, was taken off the walls in the late 19th century by her great-grandson, and replaced with a replica made in Lyon. That was taken off the walls in 1944 by the last estate owner who evacuated the movables. After the castle was turned into a museum, the decoration was replaced by a classicist style fabric featuring the pattern of vertical pink and cream stripes. The one on display today was reconstructed in the 1990s, its colours and pattern being a copy of the fabric made in Lyon, based on the preserved parts of the original. The only difference is that the pattern is not woven but printed on the pink background.

Another first-floor apartment, consisting of a salon, bedroom and bathroom, is the Chinese Apartment. It features a lowered ceiling, and combines classicist elements and far eastern patterns, with classicist and English furniture in a Chinese style. On the first floor, we can also see a complex of classicist reception rooms created for the Duchess, among those the most noteworthy two-storey Ballroom, ornamented with honey-coloured, polished wood carvings, and white engravings in the overdoor and frieze parts, all by Bauman; the Great Dining Room and chapel were all designed by Chrystian Piotr Aigner and Bauman.

The southern corridor, which is accessed from the Ballroom, features the most sophisticated painted ornaments. The Duchess had the walls and ceiling decorated with illusionist design, which transformed the interior into a gazebo located amongst ruins, overgrown with grapevine and hollyhocks. The scenery of the corridor was used by the Duchess as a background for a gallery displaying her collection of sculptures, both antique and 18th-century replicas. A similar function has the Columned Salon, located to the east of the Sculpture Gallery. Inside, among two rows of ionic columns, imitating a placement of a pagan god, only one sculpture is displayed. It is a portrait sculpture depicting Henryk, the beloved pupil of Duchess Lubomirska, presented as the ancient god Eros by Antonio Canova.

Following the Duchess' wish, in the castle's closest proximity Aigner build the library pavilion, and in cooperation with Bauman who supplied rich stucco ornaments, the classicist orangery, and the gloriette on the north-western bastion. A little further, outside the moat, the Small Romantic Castle, featuring classicist structure, with elements of Neo-Gothic, was erected. The castle grounds house the largest carriage collection in Poland located a short walk away from the castle, which include over 100 historic carriages. Nowadays, the castle is also the site of an annual classical music festival.

== Park and gardens ==
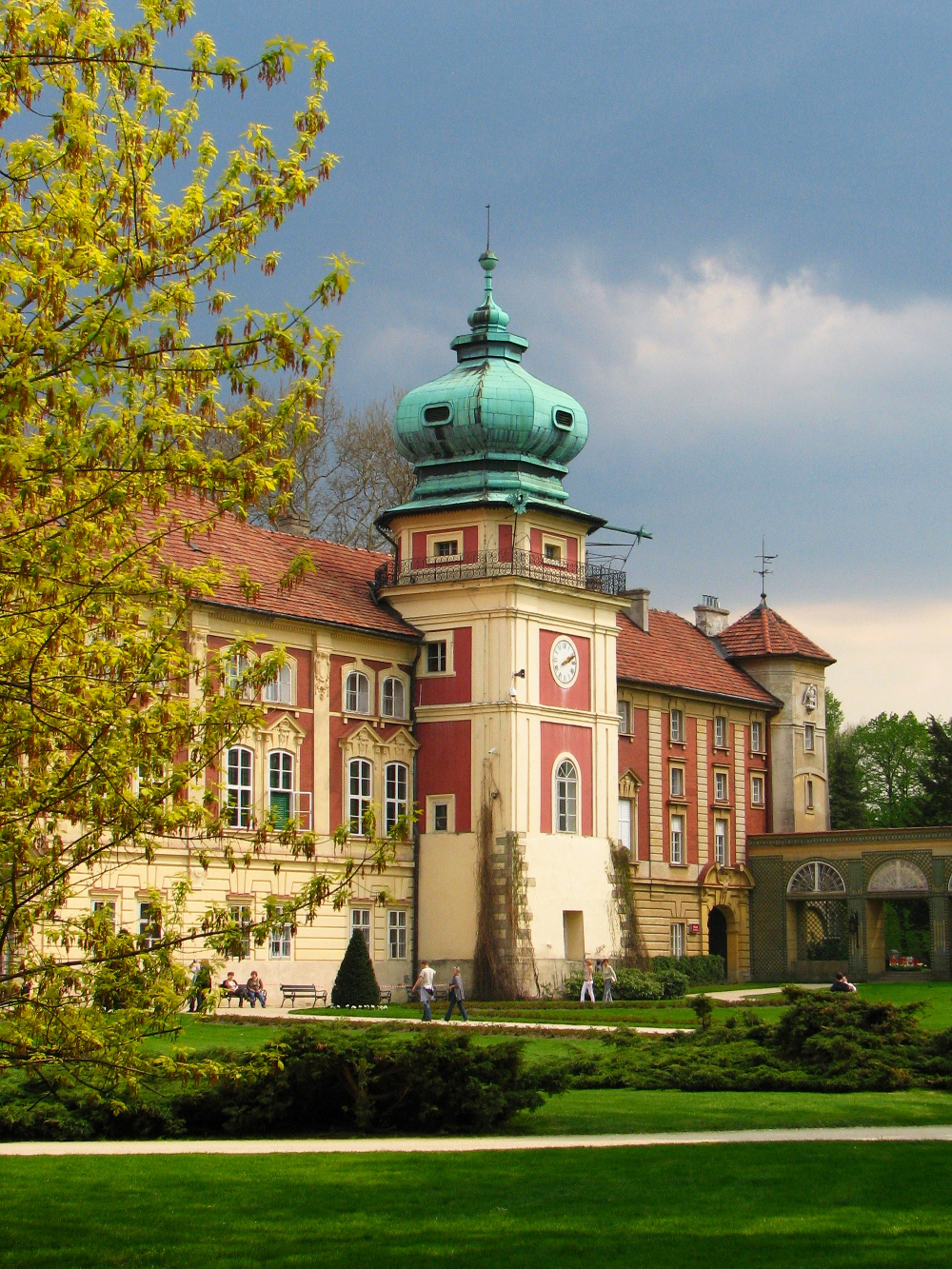
Park surrounding the castle

The castle is surrounded by a spacious and enchanting park of the early English Landscape style. Shape of the park was created in the second half of the 18th century and at the beginning of the 19th century, when it belonged to Stanisław Lubomirski. Duchess Izabela, the wife of Stanisław Lubomirski, was personally inspecting and taking care of gardens, orangery and the park. The park is about 31 hectares and is divided into an internal park, surrounded by a moat, and an external park.

The greatest attraction in the park is the Orchid House, where visitors can admire a wonderful collection of orchids which used to be the highlight of the place.

== Town ==
Outside the museum park, although in the castle's proximity, stand imposing villas and former tenements for the estate employees. The town parish church in Łańcut is also connected with the castle, as it was founded by the estate owners. The splendid Potocki family crypt constructed beneath the church was eventually used as their burial ground. Additionally, in the former farms which were part of the estate before 1944, visitors can see numerous well-preserved objects marked with the Potocki family's emblem, or with the owners' initials. Those include estate guard posts, granaries, cow barns, stables, and sheepfolds as well as the whole complex of the estate forest management in the village of Dąbrówki several kilometres away from Łańcut.

== Bibliography ==
- Edward Opaliński, Tomasz Wiślicz "Rezydencje w średniowieczu i czasach nowożytnych", Neriton, Warsaw 2001
- Adam Soćko, Tomasz Ratajczak, Piotr Korduba, "100 cudów architektury w Polsce", Publicat, Poznań 2007
- Adam Miłobędzki, "Architektura polska XVII wieku", Warsaw, 1990
- Bożenna Majewska-Maszkowska, "Mecenat artystyczny Izabelli z Czartoryskich Lubomirskiej (1736-1816)", Ossolineum, Wroclaw, 1976

== See also ==
- Architecture of Poland
- List of palaces in Poland
- List of castles in Poland
