= Fryderyk Bauman =

Polish sculptor

- Born: 1765/1770
- Died: 1845
- Children: Antoni Bauman

Fryderyk Bauman (1765/1770 — 1845) was a Polish architect and sculptor-decorator during the Classical and Romantic periods. He and his son, Antoni, worked in Łańcut. He performed numerous renovations and other work in Lviv.
