= Aleksandra Potocka =

Polish landowner and art collector

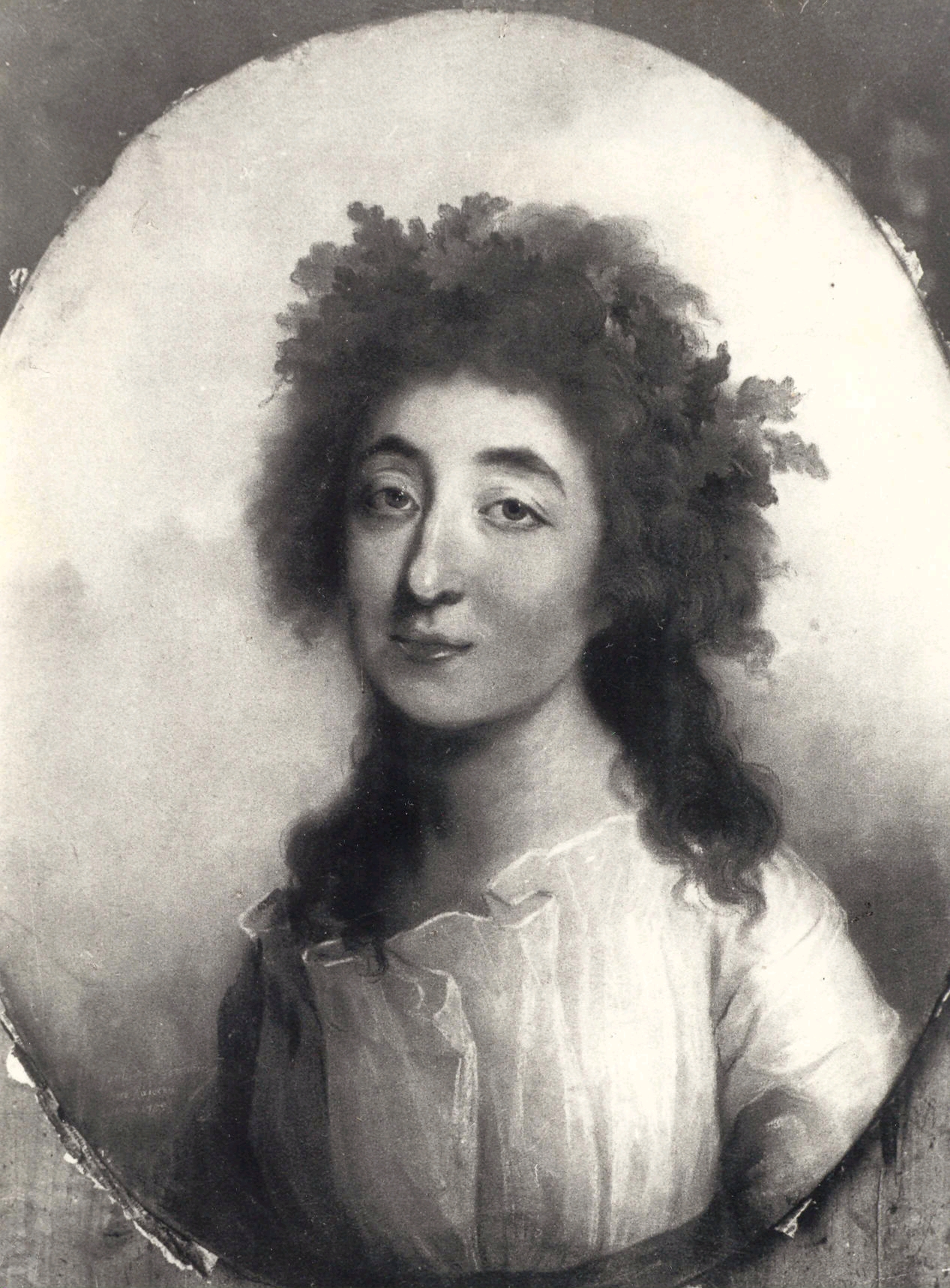

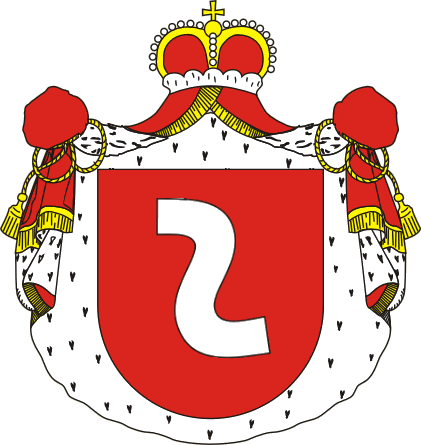
- Coat of arms: Lubomirski
- Born: 1760; Lublin
- Died: 1836 (aged 75–76); Wilanów
- Family: Lubomirski
- Spouse: Stanisław Kostka Potocki
- Issue: Aleksander Stanisław Potocki
- Father: Stanisław Lubomirski
- Mother: Elżbieta Czartoryska

Princess Aleksandra Potocka (née Lubomirska; 1760–1836) was a Polish aristocrat (szlachcianka), landowner and art collector.

She married Stanisław Kostka Potocki on 2 June 1776.
