= Czechów =

Czechów may refer to:

- Czechów, Lubusz Voivodeship, Poland
- Czechów, Świętokrzyskie Voivodeship, Poland
- Czechów Kąt

== See also ==
- Czechow (disambiguation)
- Chekhov (disambiguation)
- Czechowicz
