= Czechówka =

Czechówka may refer to:

- Czechówka, Lesser Poland Voivodeship, Poland
- Czechówka, Lublin Voivodeship, Poland

== See also ==
- Czechowo (disambiguation)
- Czechów (disambiguation)
- Czechowicz
