= Czechow =

Czechow may refer to:

- Czechów, Lubusz Voivodeship, west Poland
- Czechów, Świętokrzyskie Voivodeship, south Poland
- Czechów, Polish form of the surname Chekhov

== See also ==
- Chekhov (disambiguation)
