= Rzeszów Castle =

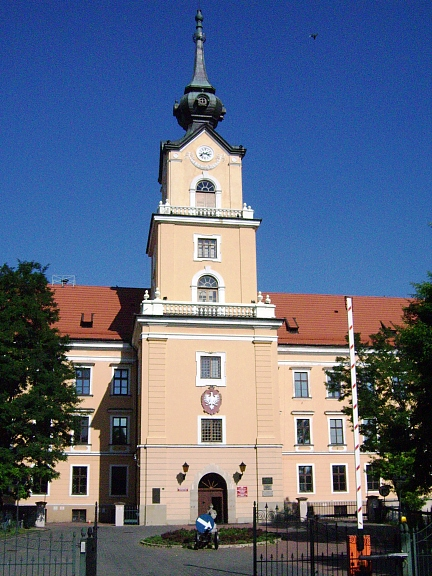
- Rzeszów Castle

- Location of the Rzeszów Castle in Poland
- 50°01′56″N 22°00′02″E
- Location: Rzeszów, Subcarpathian Voivodeship, in Poland

History
- Built: 1458
- Rebuilt: 1902-1906

Site notes
- Architect(s): Tylman van Gameren, Piotr Belotti, Jan Chrzciciel Belotti, Harol Wiedemann, Franciszek Skowron
- Architectural style: Renaissance

Rzeszów Castle is one of the main landmarks of Rzeszów, Poland. It was rebuilt between 1902 and 1906, and it is located on the former grounds of the castle of the House of Lubomirski. The castle is located between Aleja Pod Kasztanami and Aleja Lubomirski, Chopin Street, Śreniawitów Square, and Colonel Lis-Kula Street. Currently the castle houses the seat of the provincial court; the building housed a prison until 1981.

An early fortress stood on the castle's grounds in the sixteenth century. At the end of the same century, Mikołaj Spytek Ligęza built a motte-and-bailey castle close to the current castle's location. In 1620 he expanded the castle into a "Palazzo in fortezza". Following his death in 1637, the castle was inherited by his daughter Konstancja Ligęza, who married Prince Jerzy Sebastian Lubomirski. Thus, the castle came under the ownership of the House of Lubomirski. Most of the building works were done by Tylman van Gameren and Karol Henryk Wiedemann. In 1820 the complex was brought under Austrian authorities, which adapted the building for a courthouse and a prison. The building was demolished at the beginning of the twentieth century due to its poor state. The only parts left from the original complex are the gatehouse and bastion fortifications.

The Lubomirski Palace is located close to the castle.

== History of the castle ==
=== Possession of Mikołaj Spytek Ligęza ===
The founder of the Castle was the castellan of Czchów and Sandomierz Mikołaj Spytek Ligęza. The land was partially owned by Rzeszów's Elżbieta Komarnicka, widow of Adam Rzeszowski. The rest of the nearby lands were owned by Elżbieta's sisters - Katarzyna and Zofia.

==== Primordial embankments ====
The capital of Rzeszów's lands was located on a loess hill, in between Wisłok flood waters, allowing natural defences. The residence was located on top of a cliff side, in the town of Ligęza. If such complex existed, it would have stone fortifications and wooden farmhouses in the centre. The fortress' courtyard was made of mud and wood, strengthened by wooden towers, located in its corners. The Ligęza fortress was expanded during the sixteenth century, whose fortifications are still currently found.

==== First defensive fortress ====
Not a lot is known about the initial construction of Ligęza's fortress (castle). No information about the architect nor scripture of the fortress has been preserved. Most of the information gathered about the complex is of the stock-taking done by Zygmund Hendel in 1897.

The main building of the complex was fortified with walls, it had several levels and a double-courtyard located in the northern part of the complex. The complex's floor plan was similar to that of a square. Close by the complex, there were a number of warehouses - whose function remains uncertain. The whole complex and warehouses were surrounded by a thick defensive wall - whose thickness passed 1,5 metres. The three parts of the complex (east, west and south) all had posterns with battery artillery. The fortification was strengthened by a bastion, located in the south-east corner of the complex's square formation. It is likely that another one stood in the south-west of the complex. There is no other identification for the former existence of two other bastions, although during Ligęza's reign they might have been planned. The gate which allowed access to head into the castle was located, where it currently is, in the middle of the western wall.

The main reason for Ligęza to build such powerful and well defended fortress may have been to so to underline his importance, authority and wealth, making his fortress and fortifications to have a greater role for repressing the people, and accepting his reign, than actually serving as a defensive fortress. Such perception can be strengthened by the accounts of his nephew - Andrzej Ligęza, who tried to become his successor. In 1603, he marched his army into Rzeszów - devastating the walls, burned the warehouses and began besieging the castle - which was successful after a few days. Mikołaj Ligęza addressed the situation by devastating Andrzej's property in Staroniwa and Zwieńczyca. In effect Andrzej had looted Rzeszów, regaining the castle. In the following years, Mikołaj Ligęza had continued his scuffles with Stanisław Stadnicki of Łańcut (1600-1605), and with his son Władysław (1617-1619). All of these clashes meant that, after 1620, when Mikołaj Ligęza became a castellan, he ordered for a reconstruction of the castle.

==== Palazzo in fortezza ====
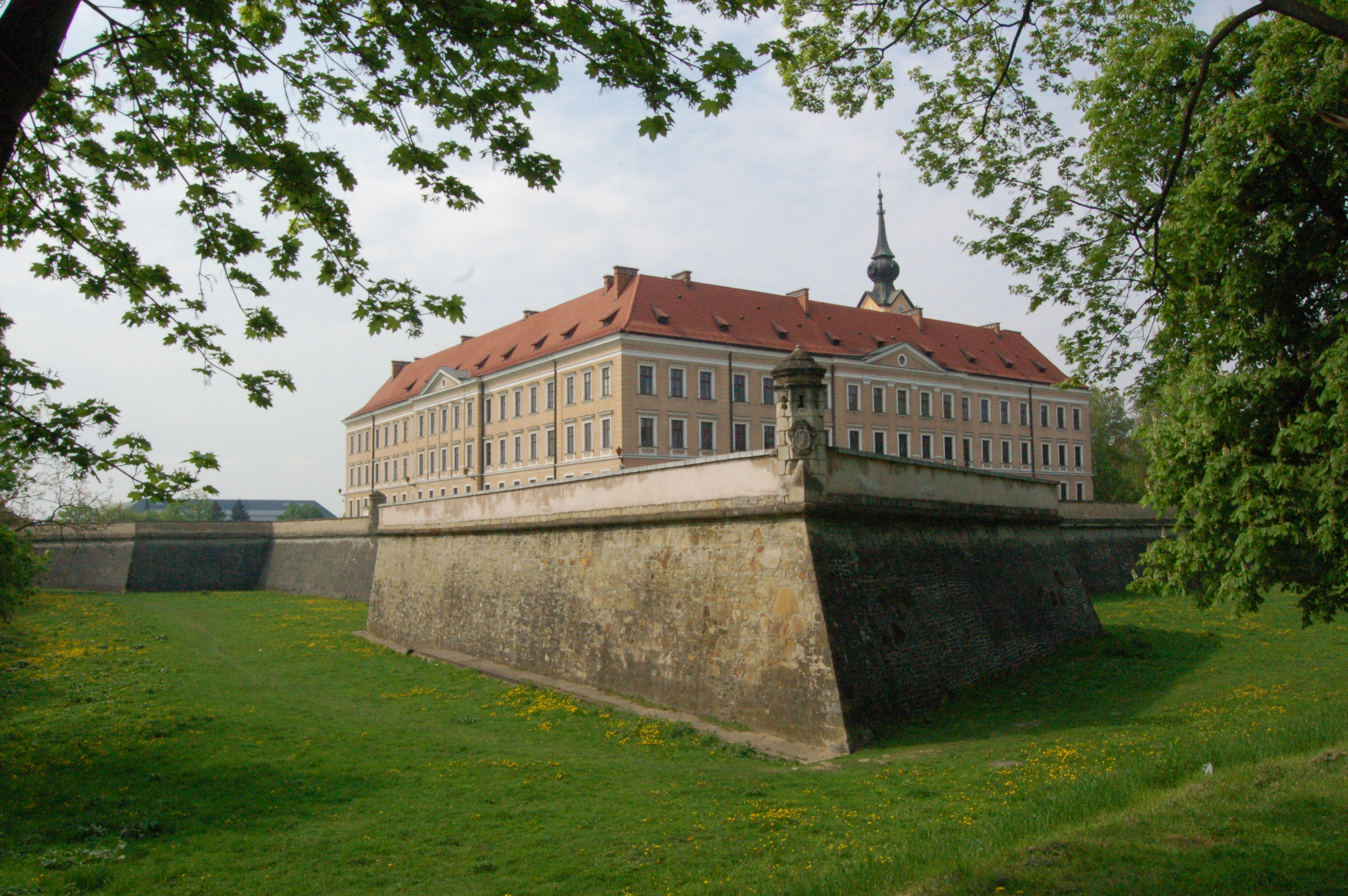
Castle fortifications

The newly reconstructed castle was built in the newly popular Palazzo in fortezza architectural form. The loess was built up with moats and bastions in a New-Italian style, built up with stone and brick pallium; some parts with clay. The former defensive walls were incorporated as inner walls of the castle. This allowed the castle to have an additional defensive wing. The investment was never finished, however its modernisation allowed for new batteries to be constructed; this had allowed the castle to successfully be defended against by a raid of Tartars. During the reconstruction, the castle had been protected by a full army. The fortifications had been additionally encircled by a wood and partially stone settlements including Mrowla, Świlcza, Krasne and Malawa.

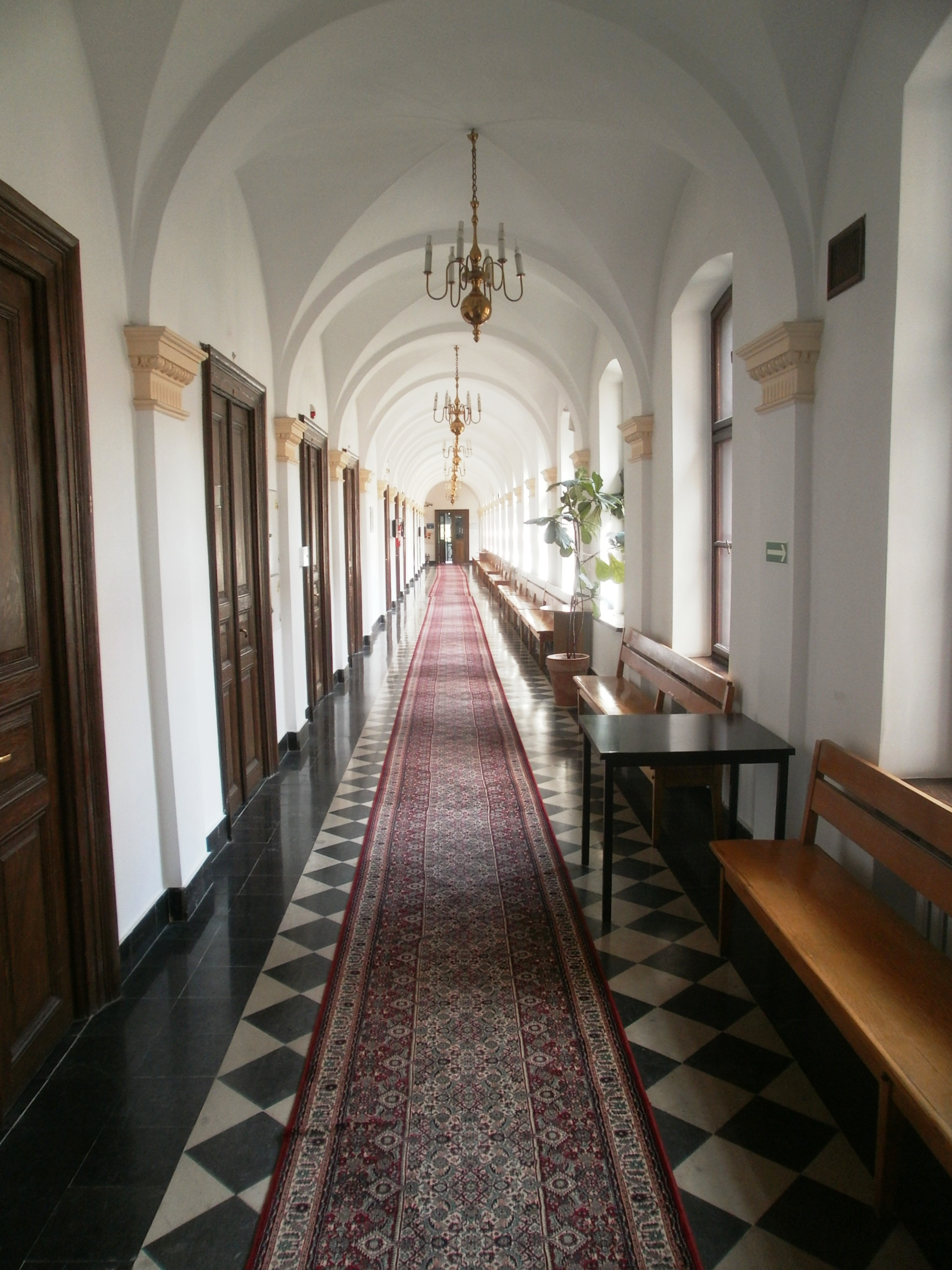
Gallery in the Rzeszów Castle

Mikołaj Ligęza died in 1637. In his testament to his wife he said: fortify the castle and call it the Ligęza's and moat it all, (aby zamku domurowała i po wieczne czasy Ligęzowem nazwała i obwałować kazała, Polish).

==== House of Lubomirski ====
Ligęza signed off his castle to his daughters: Pudancja and Konstancja. However, due to the decision taken up by the Crown Tribunal, all of the estate was only given to the Konstancja. This caused scuffles between Pudancja's and Konstancja's husbands; as Konstancja's husband - Court Marshall of the Crown Jerzy Sebastian Lubomirski took over the estate. He was an active politician and military commander of the Anti-Crown Opposition. During his reign, the castle did not have military importance, this also included the Łańcut Castle - an important residence; this state must have been caused by the castle's devastation. The fortifications were greatly devastated by the Swedes during The Deluge, as well as the Polish army during a rebellion in 1663. Additional damage was caused during a war with the Cossacks. After Lubomirski took on a bannire, he was expelled and moved to Silesia, which caused the fortifications in Rzeszów not to be reconstructed. When Ulryk Werdum passed through the town in 1671 he described it as:

In the suburb there stands a beautiful church, and even a better one in town, both made of stone [...]. The castle, a cumbrous structure, stands to the south by the lake. All of these places were in a very good state before the war with the Cossacks, after it everything seems to be abandoned.

(Na przedmieściu stoi śliczny kościół, a jeszcze lepszy w mieście, obydwa z kamienia [...]. Ciężko zbudowany zamek wznosi się na południe od miasta nad jeziorem. Wszystko to znajdowało się w bardzo dobrym stanie przed wojną kozacką, teraz zaś po niej wszystko jest opuszczone. Polish)

Jerzey Lubomirski died in 1667, giving the estate to his son, Hieronim Augustyn Lubomirski. In the first few years after his father's death, Hieronim took on dealing with war specialised equipment and crafts - he fought with the Turks, Tatars and Cossacks. Only up until about 1682, did he begin works on reconstructing the castle in Rzeszów, which he entrusted to Tylman van Gameren.

==== Expansion of the castle by Tylman van Gameren ====
Due to many battles in the region of Rzeszów, such as the battles with Cossacks and Tatars, the castle's military significance rose. He agreed, after raising the issue at the Sejmik, that he will spend three years to rebuild the castle's fortifications.

As stated in Tylman's plans, the castle was rebuilt in a square formation, with four wings both having two levels each, protected by a ravelin at the castle's southern wing. The courtyard's levels had a facade in the central part of the structure. They were finished off by ramparts.

== See also ==
- Castles in Poland
