= Mikołajewice =

Mikołajewice may refer to the following places:

- Mikołajewice, Greater Poland Voivodeship (west-central Poland)
- Mikołajewice, Pabianice County in Łódź Voivodeship (central Poland)
- Mikołajewice, Sieradz County in Łódź Voivodeship (central Poland)
- Mikołajewice, Silesian Voivodeship (south Poland)
