= Chekhovsky =

Chekhovsky (masculine), Chekhovskaya (feminine), or Chekhovskoye (neuter) may refer to:

- Chekhovsky District, a district of Moscow Oblast, Russia
- Chekhovsky (rural locality) (Chekhovskaya, Chekhovskoye), name of several rural localities in Russia
- Chekhovskaya, a station of the Moscow Metro, Moscow, Russia

== See also ==
- Chekhov (disambiguation)
- Chekhovo
