= Ligęza =

Polish noble family

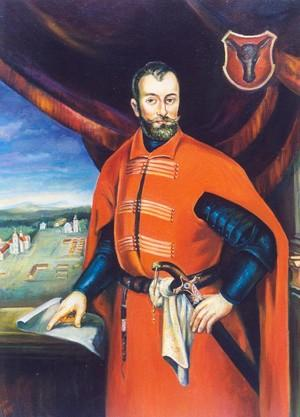
Mikołaj Spytek Ligęza

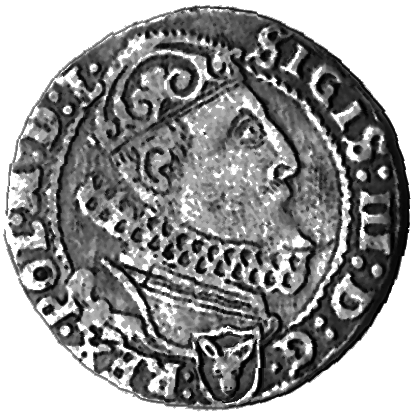
"Szóstak" (coin) with King Sigismund III Vasa and the coat of arms of Treasurer Hermolaus Ligęza (1626)

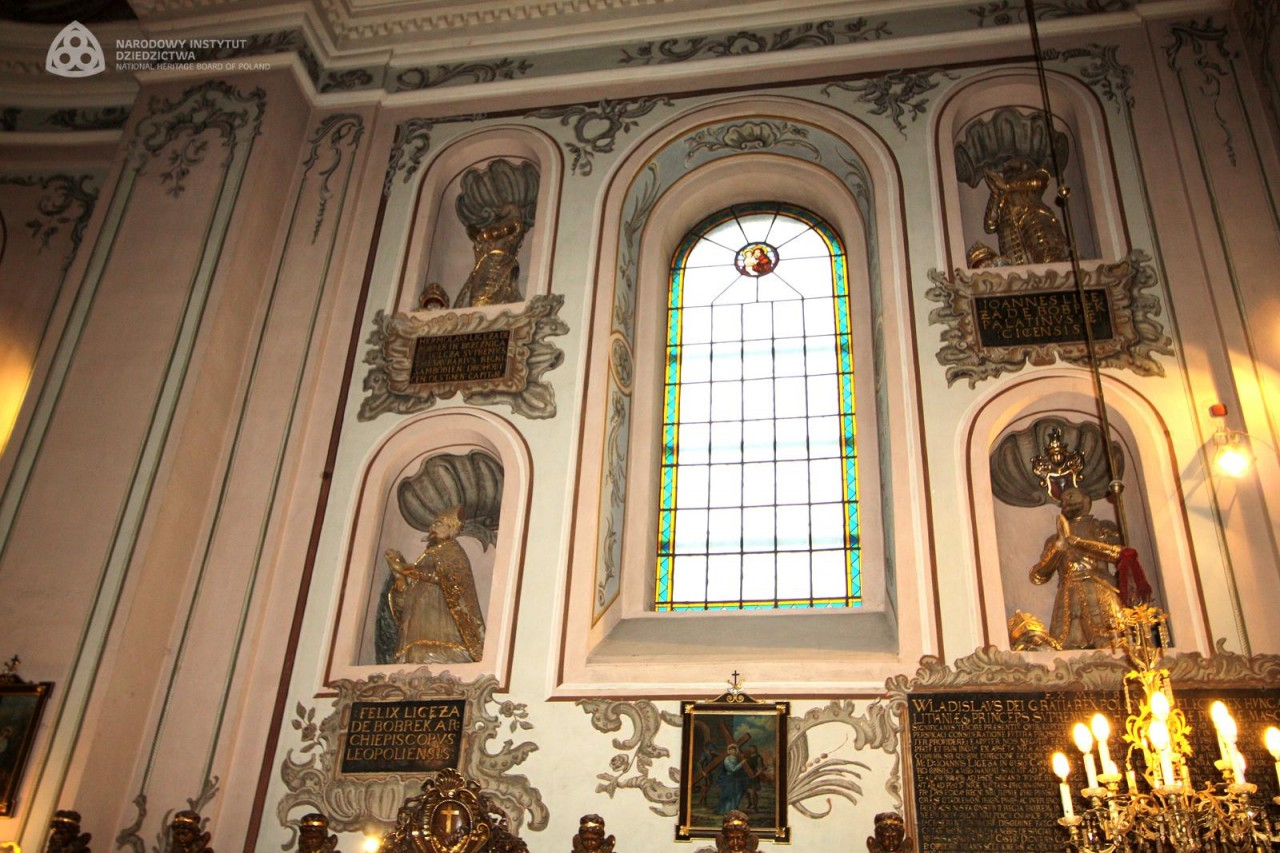
Ligęza mausoleum, Bernardine Church, Rzeszów

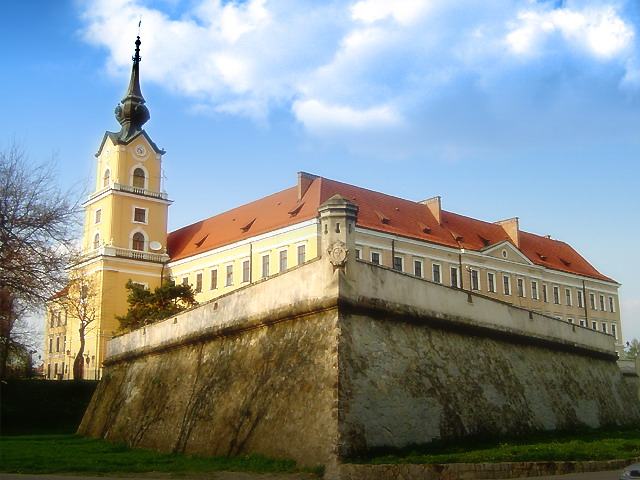
Rzeszów Castle

The Ligęza (Ligeza), plural: Ligęzowie was a Polish noble family. The family became important in the 15th and 16th century.

== Notable members ==
- Dzierżykraj Półkozic (c. 1210 – ?), castellan of Połaniec.
- Jan Ligęza (died 1419), voivode of Łęczyca, commander of the 32nd Banner at the Battle of Grunwald.
- Hermolaus Ligęza (died 1632), marshal of the Crown Tribunal, Grand Treasurer of the Crown.
- Feliks Ligęza (c. 1500 – 1560), archbishop of Lwów.
- Konstancja Ligęza (died 1648), married Prince Jerzy Sebastian Lubomirski.
- Mikołaj Ligęza (c. 1530 – 1603), castellan of Czechów.
- Mikołaj Spytek Ligęza (c. 1562 – 1637), owner of the City of Rzeszów.
- Stanisław Ligęza z Gorzyc (died 1462), knight.
- Stanisław Szczęsny Ligęza (died 1536), castellan of Chełmno.
- Gabriel Kilian de Bobrek Ligęza (defended philosophy thesis 1628), jesuit.

== Coat of arms ==
The family used the Półkozic coat of arms.

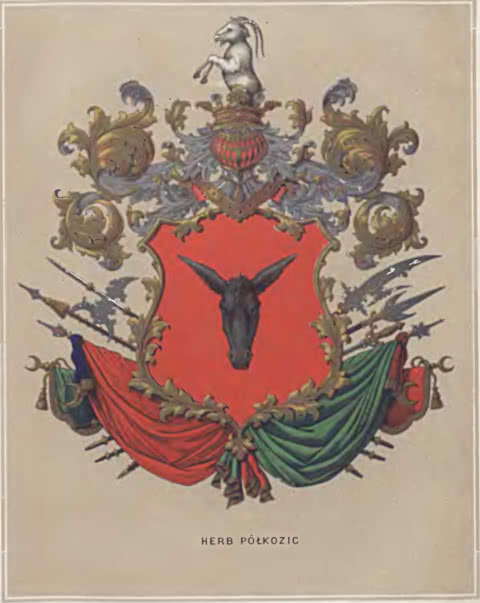

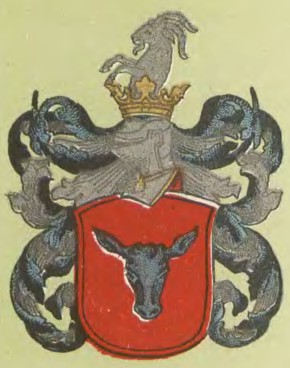

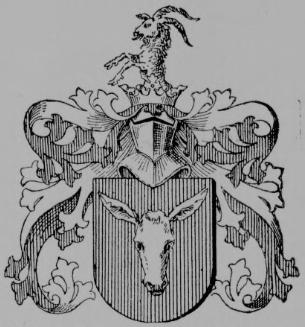

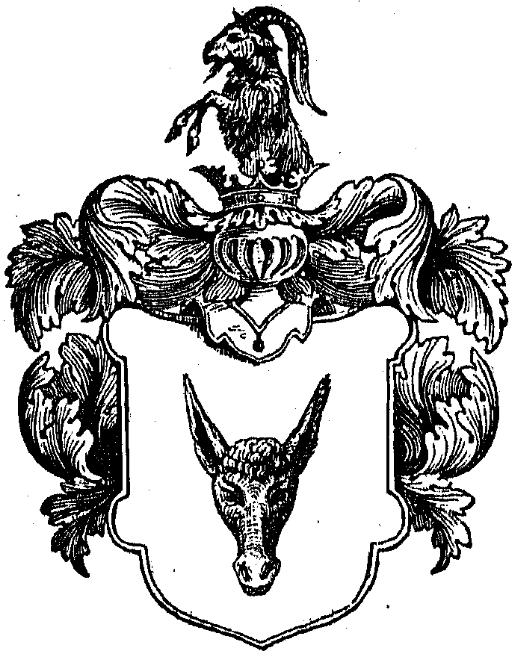

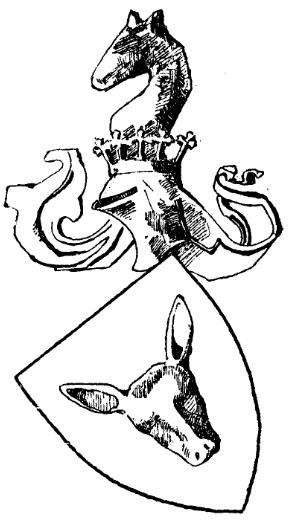

== Bibliography ==
- Adam Boniecki: Herbarz polski. T. 14. Warszawa: Skład Główny Gebethner i Wolff, 1911, pp. 249–258.
- Mariusz Lubczyński: Początki rodziny Ligęzów herbu Półkozic. Poznań: Towarzystwo Miłosników Historii w Poznaniu; Poznańskie Towarzystwo Przyjaciół Nauk, 1999, pp. 1–26.

== See also ==
- Szlachta
- List of szlachta
- Polish–Lithuanian Commonwealth
- Polish heraldry
- Rzeszów Castle
