= Lubomirski Palace =

Lubomirski Palace is the name of several palaces of the Lubomirski family:

- Lubomirski Palace, Białystok pl:Pałac Rüdigerów w Białymstoku
- Lubomirski Palace, Warsaw pl:Pałac Lubomirskich w Warszawie
  Presidential Palace, Warsaw
  Szustr House pl:Pałac Szustra
- Lubomirski Palace, Kraków pl:Pałac Lubomirskich w Krakowie
- Lubomirski Palace, Lublin pl:Pałac Lubomirskich w Lublinie
- Lubomirski Palace, Opole Lubelskie
- Lubomirski Palace, Przemyśl pl:Pałac Lubomirskich w Przemyślu
- Summer Palace, Rzeszów pl:Letni Pałac Lubomirskich w Rzeszowie
- Lubomirski Palace, Lviv
- Lubomirski Palace in Rivne
- Dubno Castle

== Residential castles ==
- Łańcut Castle
- Nowy Wiśnicz Castle
- Rzeszów Castle
