= Błędowa =

Błędowa may refer to the following places in Poland:

- Błędowa Tyczyńska
- Błędowa Zgłobieńska
