= Tadeusz Tomaszewski =

Polish politician (born 1959)

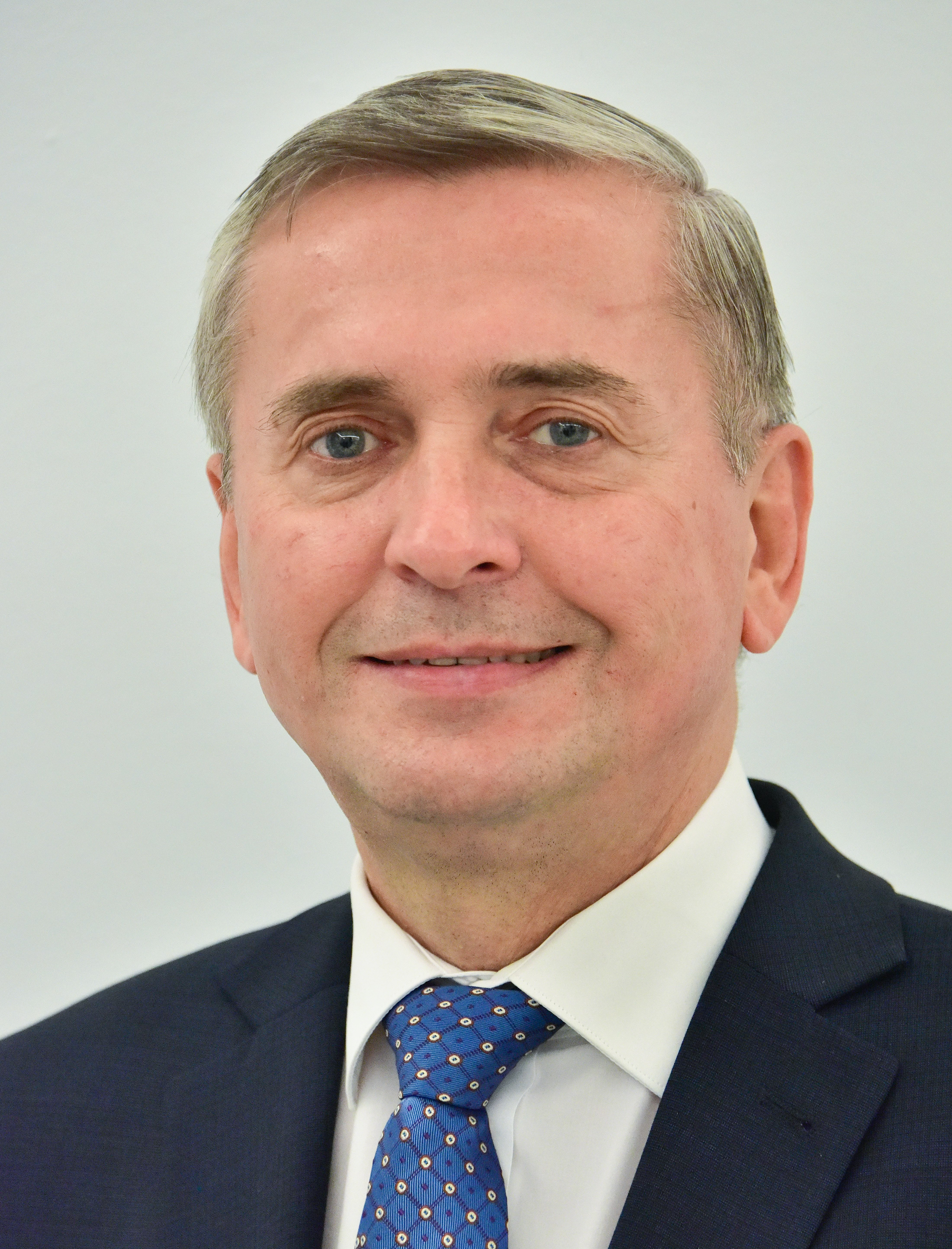

Member of the Sejm
- In office 19 September 1993 – 11 November 2015
- Incumbent
- Assumed office 12 November 2019

Personal details
- Born: 21 February 1959 (age 67)
- Party: Democratic Left Alliance

Tadeusz Tomaszewski ( pronounced [taˈdɛ.uʂ tɔmaˈʂɛfskʲi]; born 21 February 1959 in Niechanowo) is a Polish politician and economist, who has served as a member of the Sejm of the Republic of Poland since 1993, with a break between 2015 and 2019. A member of New Left (Nowa Lewica) he represents the Konin constituency and serves as chairman of the Sejm's Committee on Physical Culture, Sport and Tourism.

He was elected to Sejm on 25 September 2005, getting 12213 votes in 37 Konin district as a candidate from the Democratic Left Alliance list.

== Parliamentary career ==
Tomaszewski is one of the longest-serving members of the Polish Sejm. According to official parliamentary records and election data, he first entered the Sejm in 1993 and has been elected for multiple terms between 1993 and 1997, 1997–2001, 2001–2005, 2005–2007, 2007–2011, 2011–2015. After a break (2015–2019), he returned to parliament in 2019 and was re-elected in 2023; his current term runs from 13 November 2023 onward. In the 2023 election, he ran from the Nowa Lewica list in constituency 37 (Konin) and was elected with 17 181 votes. He took the parliamentary oath on 13 November 2023 and became a member of the tenth-term Sejm. His cumulative service includes the II (1993–1997), III (1997–2001), IV (2001–2005), V (2005–2007), VI (2007–2011), VII (2011–2015) Sejm. After not serving in the eighth term (2015–2019), he returned to parliament following the 2019 parliamentary election for IX (2019–2023), and X (2023–present) Sejm.

Tomaszewski was previously associated with the Democratic Left Alliance (Sojusz Lewicy Demokratycznej, SLD). Following the reorganisation of Poland's left-wing political parties, he became affiliated with Nowa Lewica. In the tenth-term Sejm, he is a member of the Koalicyjny Klub Parlamentarny Lewicy, a parliamentary caucus comprising representatives of left-wing parties, and serves as its secretary.

== Committee Roles & Activities ==
In November 2023, Tomaszewski was elected chairman of the Chairman of the Committee on Physical Culture, Sport and Tourism (Komisja Kultury Fizycznej, Sportu i Turystyki). The committee deals with parliamentary matters relating to sport, physical culture and tourism. He has chaired its meetings and overseen committee proceedings during the tenth term of the Sejm and holds leadership positions within the left-wing parliamentary club.

== Political Affiliation ==
Historically, Tomaszewski was active in left-wing and social democratic organizations, including the Sojusz Lewicy Demokratycznej (SLD). Following the merger and reorganization of Poland’s left, he is currently a member of Nowa Lewica and represents its parliamentary delegation.

== Additional Information ==
Tomaszewski has been recognized with local honorary citizenships and has longstanding engagement with civil society organizations in Wielkopolska.

== See also ==
- Members of Polish Sejm 2005-2007
