= Kędzierzyn =

Kędzierzyn may refer to the following places:

- Kędzierzyn, Greater Poland Voivodeship (west-central Poland)
- Kędzierzyn, Masovian Voivodeship (east-central Poland)
- Kędzierzyn, West Pomeranian Voivodeship (north-west Poland)
- Kędzierzyn-Koźle, the capital city of Kędzierzyn-Koźle County, Silesia, Poland
