= Grzegorz Lewandowski =

Polish footballer

Personal information
- Full name: Grzegorz Jarosław Lewandowski
- Date of birth: 1 September 1969 (age 57)
- Place of birth: Szczecinek, Poland
- Height: 1.83 m (6 ft 0 in)
- Position: Midfielder

Team information
- Current team: Fala Hen Gąski
- Number: 99

Youth career
- Zawisza Grzmiąca

Senior career*
Years	Team	Apps	(Gls)
1987–1989	Gwardia Koszalin		
1989–1994	Wisła Kraków	124	(11)
1994	→ CD Logroñés (loan)	15	(1)
1994–1996	Legia Warsaw	54	(3)
1996–1997	SM Caen	28	(0)
1997–1998	Polonia Warsaw	26	(3)
2000–2001	Zagłębie Lubin	22	(2)
2001	RKS Radomsko	1	(0)
2001	Hutnik Kraków	12	(1)
2001	Adelaide City	9	(0)
2002	Hutnik Kraków		
2002–2003	Gwardia Koszalin		
2004	Kotwica Kołobrzeg		
2005	Ruch Wysokie Mazowieckie		
2005–2006	Kotwica Kołobrzeg		
2007	Astra Ustronie Morskie		
2007	ŁKS Łomża	18	(1)
2008	Rega-Merida Trzebiatów	6	(0)
2009–2011	Sława Sławno		
2011–2012	Gwardia Koszalin		
2012–2013	Mewa Resko		
2014–2017	Sława Sławno		
2018	Olimpik/Mieszko Warszkowo	7	(0)
2018–2019	Garbarnia Kępice	20	(0)
2019–2021	Olimpik/Mieszko Warszkowo	28	(2)
2021	Błękitni Tychowo	19	(0)
2022	Mechanik Turowo	11	(0)
2023–2024	Arkadia Malechowo	26	(0)
2024–	Fala Hen Gąski	7	(0)

International career
1993–1996	Poland	5	(0)

Managerial career
- 2003: Gwardia Koszalin (player-manager)
- 2004: Kotwica Kołobrzeg (player-manager)
- 2004–2005: Ruch Wysokie Mazowieckie
- 2005–2006: Kotwica Kołobrzeg (player-manager)
- 2007: ŁKS Łomża (player-manager)
- 2007: Rega Trzebiatów
- 2009–2010: Sława Sławno (player-manager)
- 2011: Gwardia Koszalin (player-manager)
- 2012–2013: Mewa Resko (player-manager)
- 2014: Sława Sławno
- 2015: Szkółka Piłkarska Młodzi Spartanie
- 2015: Sparta Brodnica
- 2015–2018: Sława Sławno (player-manager)
- 2018: Pogoń Lębork
- 2018–2019: Garbarnia Kępice (player-manager)
- * Club domestic league appearances and goals as of 20 October 2024

Grzegorz Jarosław Lewandowski (born 1 September 1969) is a Polish footballer and manager who plays as a midfielder for Klasa B club Fala Hen Gąski.

== International career ==
He played 5 times for Poland.

== Honours ==
Legia Warsaw

- Ekstraklasa: 1994–95
- Polish Cup: 1994–95
- Polish Super Cup: 1994
