= Tadeusz Żychiewicz =

Polish journalist, art historian and publicist

Tadeusz Żychiewicz (12 January 1922 in Bratkowice – 11 November 1994 in Kraków) was a Polish journalist, art historian, religious publicist, theologist, Biblicist, feuilletonist and editor of Tygodnik Powszechny, soldier of Armia Krajowa.

== Notable works ==
Publication series

- Cnoty i niecnoty (released as a book)
- Poczta Ojca Malachiasza (released as a book)

Books

- Dom Ojca: Rok Mateusza, rok Marka, rok Łukasza
- Dziesięcioro przykazań
- Ignacy Loyola
- Jajko miejscami świeże, czyli Pytania dla teologów
- Josafat Kuncevič
- Ludzie Ziemi Nieświętej (collection of articles)
- Ludzkie drogi (collection of Żychiewicz's publications from Tygodnik Powszechny)
- Rok Łukasza
- Rok Marka
- Rok Mateusza
- Stare Przymierze
- Stare Przymierze. Exodus
- Stare Przymierze. Genesis
- Stare Przymierze. Kohelet, Hiob, Syracydes
- Stare Przymierze. Prorocy: Izajasz, Jeremiasz, Ezechiel
- Stare Przymierze. Rut, Dawid, Salomon
- Żywoty
