= Mikołaj Spytek Ligęza =

Polish–Lithuanian noble (c. 1562 – 1637)

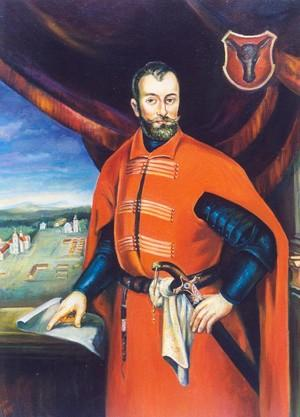
- Coat of arms: Półkozic
- Born: c. 1562; Czechów?
- Died: 1637; Dąbrowa Tarnowska
- Noble family: Ligęza
- Spouses: Zofia Rzeszowska; Elżbieta Kormanicka; Zofia Krasińska
- Mother: Elżbieta Jordanówna

Mikołaj Spytek Ligęza (c. 1562 – 1637) was a Polish–Lithuanian noble (szlachcic). He was castellan of Czechów, Żarnów, Sandomierz and was owner of Rzeszów.

He was son of Mikołaj Ligęza and Elżbieta Jordan.

He had two children: daughters Zofia Pudencjanna Ligęza and Konstancja Ligęza.
