= Marysin, Gniezno County =

Marysin
- Village
- Location within Poland
- Coordinates: 52°28′23″N 17°41′36″E
- Country: Poland
- Voivodeship: Greater Poland
- County: Gniezno
- Gmina: Niechanowo

Marysin [maˈrɨɕin] is a village in the administrative district of Gmina Niechanowo, within Gniezno County, Greater Poland Voivodeship, in west-central Poland.
