= Mierzewo =

- Village
- Location within Poland
- Coordinates: 52°24′N 17°40′E
- Country: Poland
- Voivodeship: Greater Poland
- County: Gniezno
- Gmina: Niechanowo
- Population: 340

Mierzewo [mjɛˈʐɛvɔ] is a village in the administrative district of Gmina Niechanowo, within Gniezno County, Greater Poland Voivodeship, in west-central Poland.
