= Gmina Świlcza =

Gmina Świlcza Świlcza Commune
- Gmina
- Interactive map of Gmina Świlcza
- Coordinates (Świlcza): 50°4′N 21°55′E
- Country: Poland
- Voivodeship: Subcarpathian
- County: Rzeszów County
- Seat: Świlcza

Area
  - Total: 106.59 km^{2} (41.15 sq mi)

Population (2006)
  - Total: 18,819
  - Density: 176.56/km^{2} (457.28/sq mi)
- Website: https://www.swilcza.com.pl

Gmina Świlcza is a rural gmina (administrative district) in Rzeszów County, Subcarpathian Voivodeship, in south-eastern Poland. Its seat is the village of Świlcza, which lies approximately 8 kilometres (5 mi) north-west of the regional capital Rzeszów.

The gmina covers an area of 128.42 square kilometres (49.6 sq mi), and as of 2006 its total population is 18,819.

== Villages ==
Gmina Świlcza contains the villages and settlements of Błędowa Zgłobieńska, Bratkowice, Bzianka, Dąbrowa, Mrowla, Rudna Wielka, Świlcza, Trzciana and Woliczka.

== Neighbouring gminas ==
Gmina Świlcza is bordered by the city of Rzeszów and by the gminas of Boguchwała, Głogów Małopolski, Iwierzyce, Kolbuszowa and Sędziszów Małopolski.
