= Gmina Niechanowo =

Gmina Niechanowo Niechanowo Commune
- Gmina
- Coat of arms
- Interactive map of Gmina Niechanowo
- Coordinates (Niechanowo): 52°27′50″N 17°40′49″E
- Country: Poland
- Voivodeship: Greater Poland
- County: Gniezno
- Seat: Niechanowo

Area
  - Total: 105.31 km^{2} (40.66 sq mi)

Population (2006)
  - Total: 5,395
  - Density: 51.23/km^{2} (132.7/sq mi)
- Website: http://www.niechanowo.pl/

Gmina Niechanowo is a rural gmina (administrative district) in Gniezno County, Greater Poland Voivodeship, in west-central Poland. Its seat is the village of Niechanowo, which lies approximately 10 kilometres (6 mi) south-east of Gniezno and 53 km (33 mi) east of the regional capital Poznań.

The gmina covers an area of 105.31 square kilometres (40.7 sq mi), and as of 2006 its total population is 5,395.

== Villages ==
Gmina Niechanowo contains the villages and settlements of Arcugowo, Cielimowo, Czechowo, Drachowo, Goczałkowo, Grotkowo, Gurówko, Gurowo, Jarząbkowo, Jelitowo, Jelonek, Karsewo, Kędzierzyn, Malczewo, Marysin, Mierzewo, Mikołajewice, Miroszka, Niechanowo, Nowa Wieś Niechanowska, Potrzymowo, Trzuskołoń, Żelazkowo and Żółcz.

== Neighbouring gminas ==
Gmina Niechanowo is bordered by the town of Gniezno and by the gminas of Czerniejewo, Gniezno, Witkowo and Września.
