= Żelazkowo, Greater Poland Voivodeship =

Żelazkowo
- Village
- Location within Poland
- Coordinates: 52°28′N 17°39′E
- Country: Poland
- Voivodeship: Greater Poland
- County: Gniezno
- Gmina: Niechanowo

Żelazkowo [ʐɛlasˈkɔvɔ] is a village in the administrative district of Gmina Niechanowo, within Gniezno County, Greater Poland Voivodeship, in west-central Poland.
