= Grotkowo =

- Village
- Location within Poland
- Coordinates: 52°26′N 17°38′E
- Country: Poland
- Voivodeship: Greater Poland
- County: Gniezno
- Gmina: Niechanowo

Grotkowo [ɡrɔtˈkɔvɔ] is a village in the administrative district of Gmina Niechanowo, within Gniezno County, Greater Poland Voivodeship, in west-central Poland.
