= Malczewo, Greater Poland Voivodeship =

Malczewo
- Village
- Location within Poland
- Coordinates: 52°26′52″N 17°39′52″E
- Country: Poland
- Voivodeship: Greater Poland
- County: Gniezno
- Gmina: Niechanowo

Malczewo [malˈt͡ʂɛvɔ] is a village in the administrative district of Gmina Niechanowo, within Gniezno County, Greater Poland Voivodeship, in west-central Poland.
