= Żółcz =

- Village
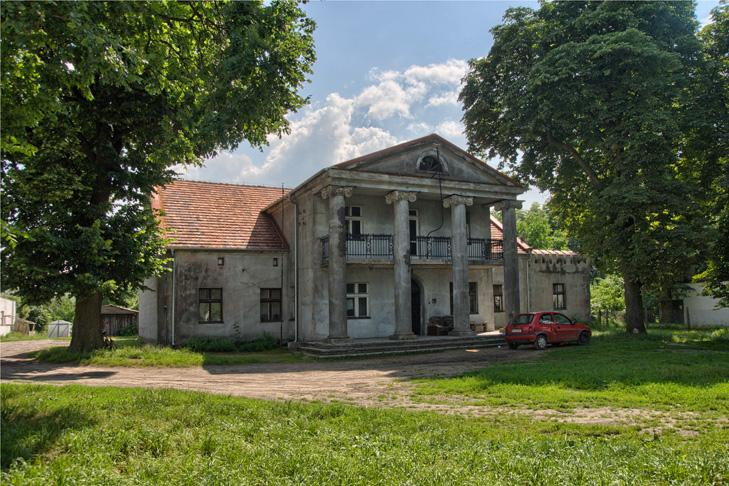

- Location within Poland
- Coordinates: 52°24′52″N 17°36′12″E
- Country: Poland
- Voivodeship: Greater Poland
- County: Gniezno
- Gmina: Niechanowo

Żółcz [ʐuu̯t͡ʂ] is a village in the administrative district of Gmina Niechanowo, within Gniezno County, Greater Poland Voivodeship, in west-central Poland.
