= Rudnianka Rudna Wielka =

Polish football club

- Full name: Klub Sportowy Rudnianka Rudna Wielka
- Founded: 1952; 74 years ago
- Ground: Rudna Wielka, Poland
- Capacity: 500
- Chairman: Grzegorz Kornaga
- Manager: Wojciech Brudek
- League: Klasa B Rzeszów I
- 2023–24: Klasa B Rzeszów I, 3rd of 12

Rudnianka Rudna Wielka is a Polish football club based in Rudna Wielka. The club was founded in 1952. The team's official colors are green and white.
