= Drachowo =

- Village
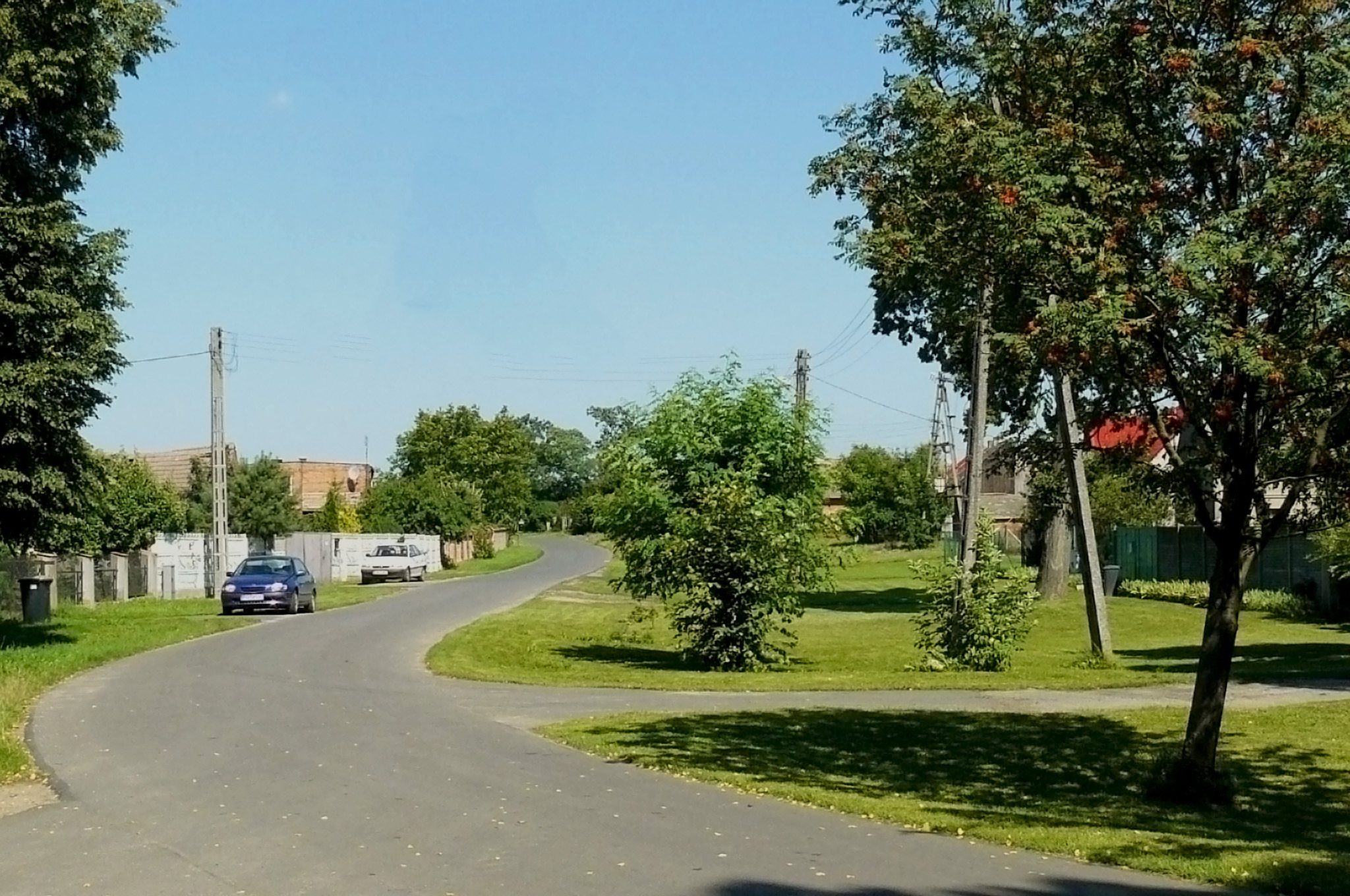
- Center of the village.

- Location within Poland
- Coordinates: 52°26′50″N 17°39′3″E
- Country: Poland
- Voivodeship: Greater Poland
- County: Gniezno
- Gmina: Niechanowo
- Elevation: 122 m (400 ft)
- Population: 110
- Postal code: 62-220

Drachowo [draˈxɔvɔ] is a village in the administrative district of Gmina Niechanowo, within Gniezno County, Greater Poland Voivodeship, in west-central Poland.

From the year 1975 to 1998, the village belonged to Poznań Voivodeship.

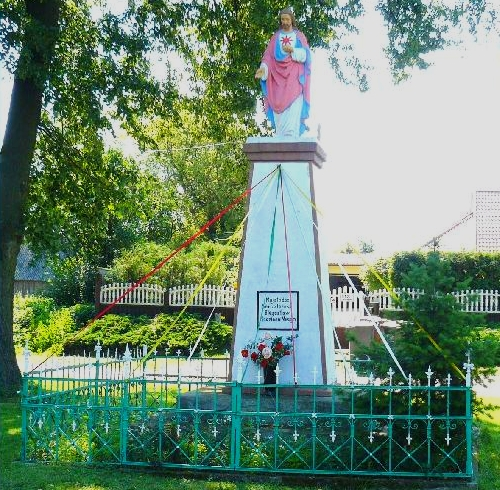
The pillar statue.

== Landmarks ==
A pillar statue representing the Sacred Heart of Jesus is located in the central square. The statue bears the inscription, Sweet Heart of Jesus, bless our families. - (untranslated) Najsłodsze Serce Jezusa błogosław rodzinom naszym.

== Legend ==
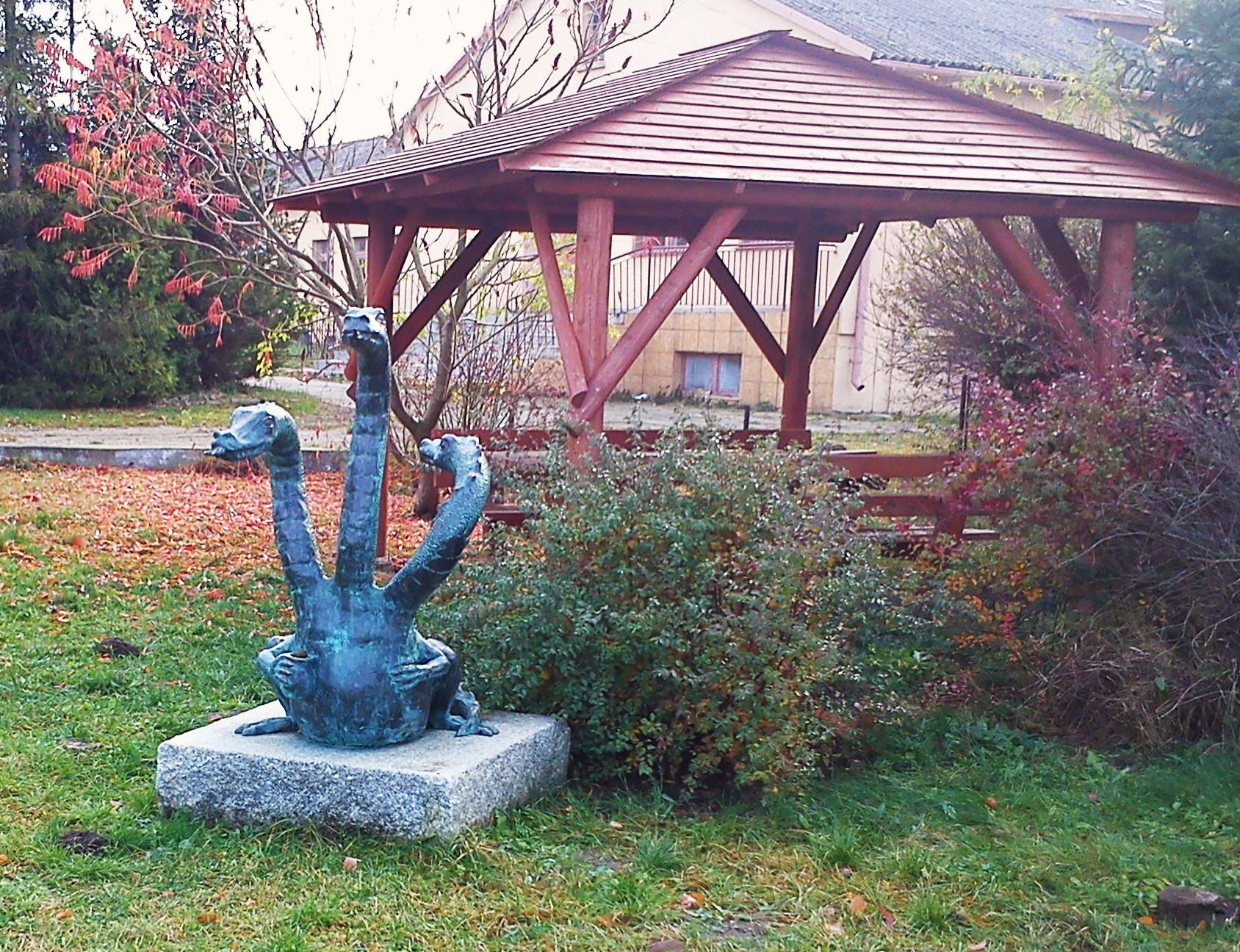
The monument of the three-headed dragon.

A legend is associated with Drachowo:

"... On the hill in the village Drachowo, in Gmina Niechanowo, where today building stands with a defunct school. In the old days, which even the oldest inhabitants don't remember, there lived a three-headed dragon in the village. He awakened fear and terror in the locals and kidnapped virgins from the neighboring hamlets. Spells and visiting witches did not help. Finally, a local beekeeper dealt with the dragon by giving the beast honey that took its life..."

According to legend, to celebrate getting rid of the dragon, beekeeping festivals were held in Drachowo for many years.

A monument of Drachowo's dragon stands in front of the former school.
