= Gurówko =

- Village
- Location within Poland
- Coordinates: 52°28′N 17°37′E
- Country: Poland
- Voivodeship: Greater Poland
- County: Gniezno
- Gmina: Niechanowo

Gurówko [ɡuˈrufkɔ] is a village in the administrative district of Gmina Niechanowo, within Gniezno County, Greater Poland Voivodeship, in west-central Poland.
