= Woliczka =

- Village
- Location within Poland
- Coordinates: 50°3′N 21°52′E
- Country: Poland
- Voivodeship: Subcarpathian
- County: Rzeszów
- Gmina: Świlcza

Woliczka [vɔˈlit͡ʂka] is a village in the administrative district of Gmina Świlcza, within Rzeszów County, Subcarpathian Voivodeship, in south-eastern Poland.
