= Bzianka, Rzeszów County =

Bzianka
- District of Rzeszów
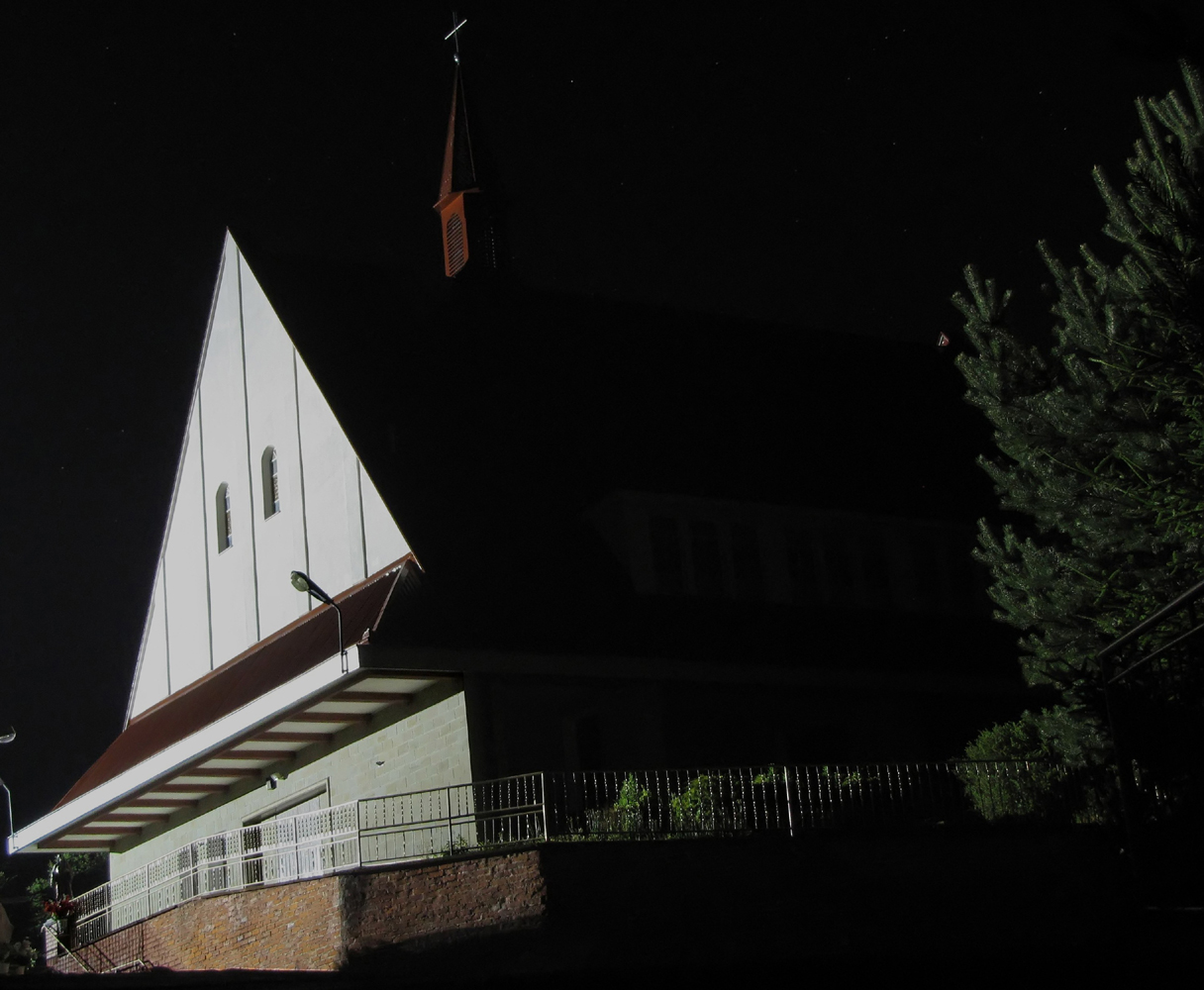
- Saint Maximilian Kolbe church in Bzianka

- Location within Poland
- Coordinates: 50°2′12″N 21°53′42″E
- Country: Poland
- Voivodeship: Subcarpathian
- County/City: Rzeszów
- Within city limits: 2017
- Time zone: UTC+1 (CET)
  - Summer (DST): UTC+2 (CEST)
- Vehicle registration: RZ
- Primary airport: Rzeszów–Jasionka Airport

Bzianka [ˈbʑanka] is a district of Rzeszów, Poland, located in the western part of the city.

Bzianka was included within the city limits of Rzeszów on January 1, 2017. Earlier, it was a separate village, located in the administrative district of Gmina Świlcza, within the Rzeszów County, Subcarpathian Voivodeship.
