= Juliusz Czechowicz =

Polish painter, graphic artist, and teacher (1894–1974)

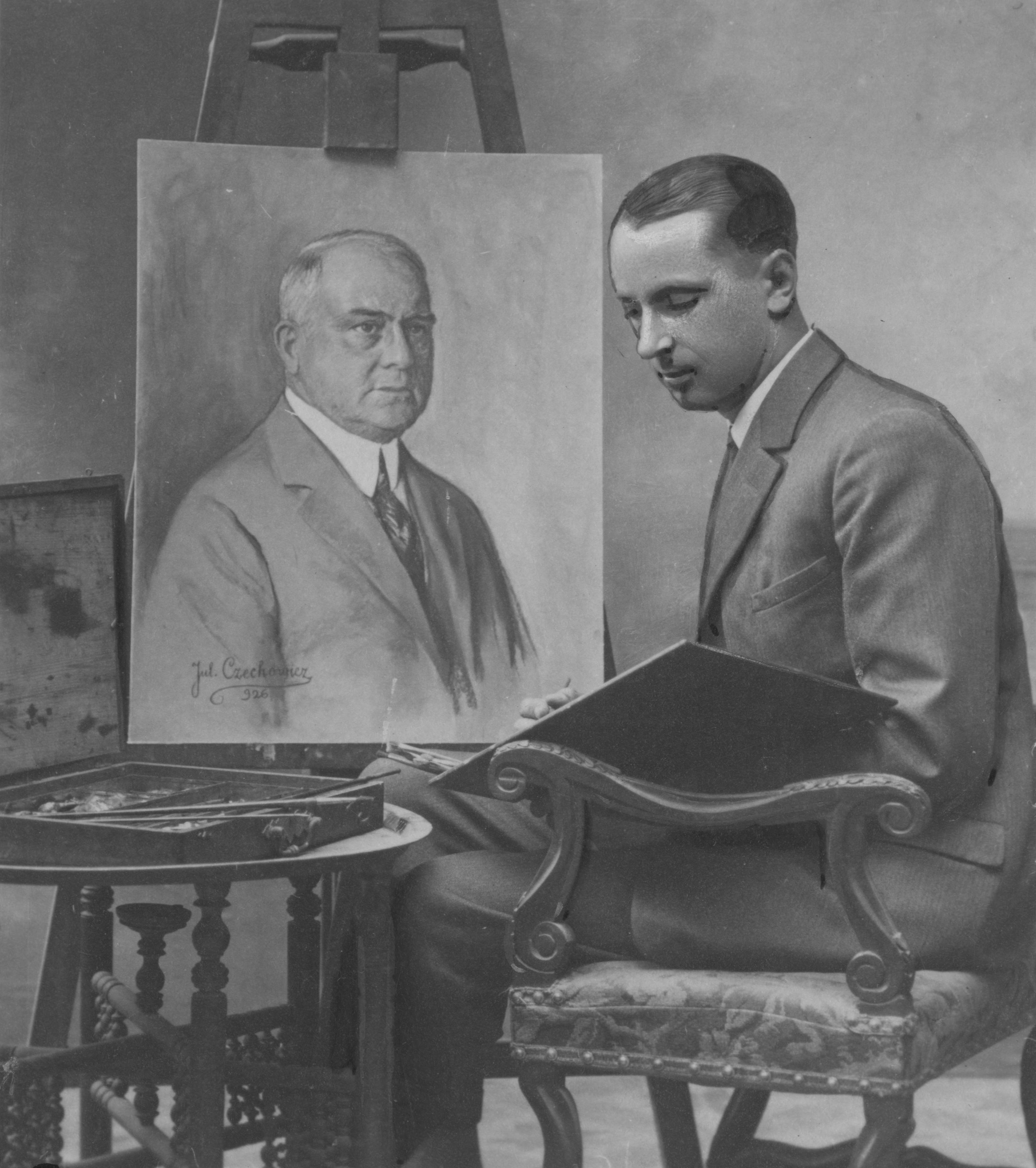
- Czechowicz during the work (1926)
- Born: 10 March 1894; Dzików, Tarnobrzeg, Galicia, Austria-Hungary
- Died: 29 March 1974 (aged 80); Kraków, Poland
- Known for: Painting

Juliusz Czechowicz (10 March 1894 – 29 March 1974) was a Polish painter, graphic artist and teacher known mainly as the author of portraits and landscapes.

== Life ==
He was the son of Karol Czechowicz and Kazimiera née Szanecka. He graduated from realschule in Stanisławów and in 1913 he entered the Academy of Fine Arts in Kraków. He was the student of Wojciech Weiss (in whose studio he spent most of the time), Józef Pankiewicz and Stanisław Kamocki. In 1917 he received a bronze medal and a cash prize at the student end-year exhibition. He took part in open air conducted by Kamocki in Dobczyce, Ciężkowice, Wola Radziszowska, Krościenko and Zakopane. He completed his studies with a very good result in 1921. He participated in the exhibition of the Association of Polish Artists and Designers in Kraków in 1923, and in 1926 he took part in an exhibition at the Palace of Art in Kraków. He was a teacher of drawing and manual works in high schools. In 1932 he exhibited his works in Zakopane. In 1933, he started studying at the Paris branch of the Kraków Academy of Fine Arts. He exhibited twice in Paris in 1934. In 1938 he ran an individual exhibition in Chorzów. He exhibited again after the end of the Second World War, from 1948; participating together in around forty national and regional exhibitions. He was a member of conservative groups Nurt and Zachęta. He persisted in custom-made portraits (among others, pastel portraits of Adam and Irena Vetulani).

He was married to Maria Zamorska. For his pedagogical work he received Medal of the Decade of Independence (1929) and Brown Medal for Long Service (1938). He died in 1974 in Kraków. He was buried at the Rakowicki Cemetery. His works are, among others, in the collection of the Historical Museum in Bielsko-Biała; there is also a pastel portrait of Czechowicz by Witkacy from 1932.
