= Potrzymowo =

- Village
- Location within Poland
- Coordinates: 52°27′N 17°37′E
- Country: Poland
- Voivodeship: Greater Poland
- County: Gniezno
- Gmina: Niechanowo

Potrzymowo [pɔtʂɨˈmɔvɔ] is a village in the administrative district of Gmina Niechanowo, within Gniezno County, Greater Poland Voivodeship, in west-central Poland.
