= Trzciana, Rzeszów County =

Trzciana
- Village
- Location within Poland
- Coordinates: 50°4′20″N 21°50′14″E
- Country: Poland
- Voivodeship: Subcarpathian
- County: Rzeszów
- Gmina: Świlcza
- Population: 2,300

Trzciana [ˈtʂt͡ɕana] is a village in the administrative district of Gmina Świlcza, within Rzeszów County, Subcarpathian Voivodeship, in south-eastern Poland.
