= Dąbrowa, Rzeszów County =

Dąbrowa
- Village
- Location within Poland
- Coordinates: 50°3′31″N 21°48′35″E
- Country: Poland
- Voivodeship: Subcarpathian
- County: Rzeszów
- Gmina: Świlcza

Population
  - Total: 989
- Time zone: UTC+1 (CET)
  - Summer (DST): UTC+2 (CEST)
- Vehicle registration: RZE

Dąbrowa ([dɔmˈbrɔva]) is a village in the administrative district of Gmina Świlcza, within Rzeszów County, Subcarpathian Voivodeship, in south-eastern Poland.

Five Polish citizens were murdered by Nazi Germany in the village during World War II.
