= Czechowo =

Czechowo may refer to:

- Czechowo, Greater Poland Voivodeship, Poland
- Czechowo, Warmian-Masurian Voivodeship, Poland
