= Chekhov (disambiguation) =

Anton Chekhov (1860–1904) was a Russian physician, dramatist and writer.

Chekhov/Chekov (masculine) or Chekhova (feminine) may also refer to:

== Places ==
- Chekhov (inhabited locality), several inhabited localities in Russia
  - Chekhov, Moscow Oblast
  - Chekhov, Sakhalin Oblast
- Chekhov (crater), a crater on Mercury

== Other uses ==
- Chekhov (surname) (Chekhova, Chekov), including fictional characters
- 2369 Chekhov, an asteroid
- Chekhov's gun, narrative principle
- Chekhov Gymnasium, school, and now museum in Taganrog
- Chekhov Library, public library in Taganrog
- Anton Chekhov-class motorship

== See also ==
- Pavel Chekov, a character from the television series Star Trek
- Commodity checkoff program, an organization that collects funds from producers of a particular agricultural commodity
- Chekhovo
- Chekhovsky (disambiguation)
