= Jelitowo =

- Village
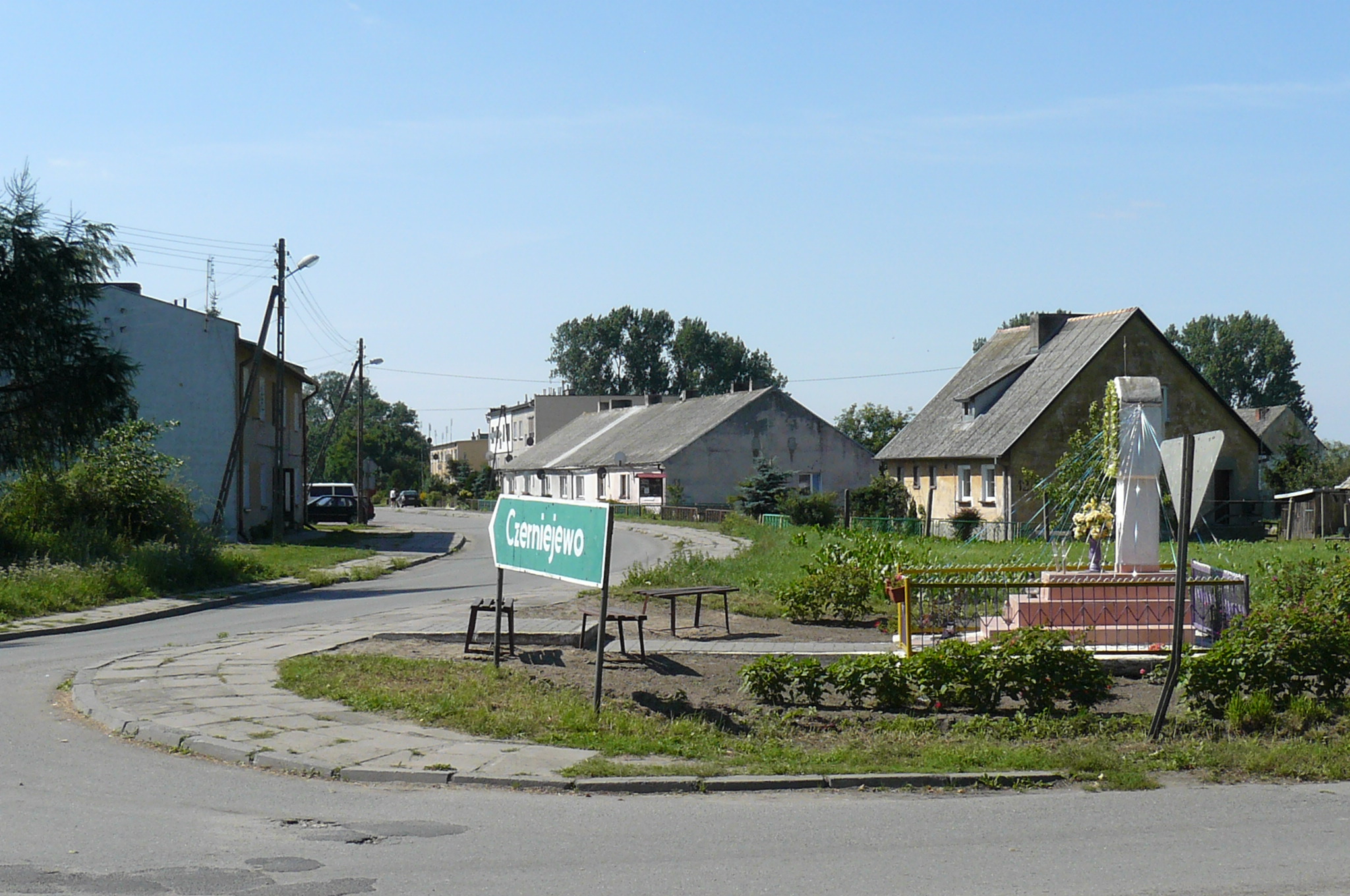
- Street of Jelitowo

- Location within Poland
- Coordinates: 52°25′51″N 17°36′19″E
- Country: Poland
- Voivodeship: Greater Poland
- County: Gniezno
- Gmina: Niechanowo

Jelitowo [jɛliˈtɔvɔ] is a village in the administrative district of Gmina Niechanowo, within Gniezno County, Greater Poland Voivodeship, in west-central Poland.
