= Chekhovo =

Chekhovo (Russian: Че́хово) is the name of several rural localities in Russia:

- Chekhovo, Irkutsk Oblast, a selo in Nizhneudinsky District of Irkutsk Oblast
- Chekhovo, Kaliningrad Oblast, a settlement in Gvardeysky Rural Okrug of Bagrationovsky District of Kaliningrad Oblast
- Chekhovo, Smolensk Oblast, a village in Kikinskoye Rural Settlement of Tyomkinsky District of Smolensk Oblast
- Chekhovo, Tver Oblast, a village in Rameshkovsky District of Tver Oblast

== See also ==
- Chekhov (disambiguation)
- Chekhovsky (disambiguation)
