= Jelonek, Gniezno County =

Jelonek
- Village
- Location within Poland
- Coordinates: 52°30′17″N 17°37′29″E
- Country: Poland
- Voivodeship: Greater Poland
- County: Gniezno
- Gmina: Niechanowo

Jelonek [jɛˈlɔnɛk] is a village in the administrative district of Gmina Niechanowo, within Gniezno County, Greater Poland Voivodeship, in west-central Poland.
