= Miroszka =

- Village
- Location within Poland
- Coordinates: 52°27′53″N 17°43′14″E
- Country: Poland
- Voivodeship: Greater Poland
- County: Gniezno
- Gmina: Niechanowo
- Population: 100

Miroszka [miˈrɔʂka] is a village in the administrative district of Gmina Niechanowo, within Gniezno County, Greater Poland Voivodeship, in west-central Poland.
