= Niechanowo =

- Village
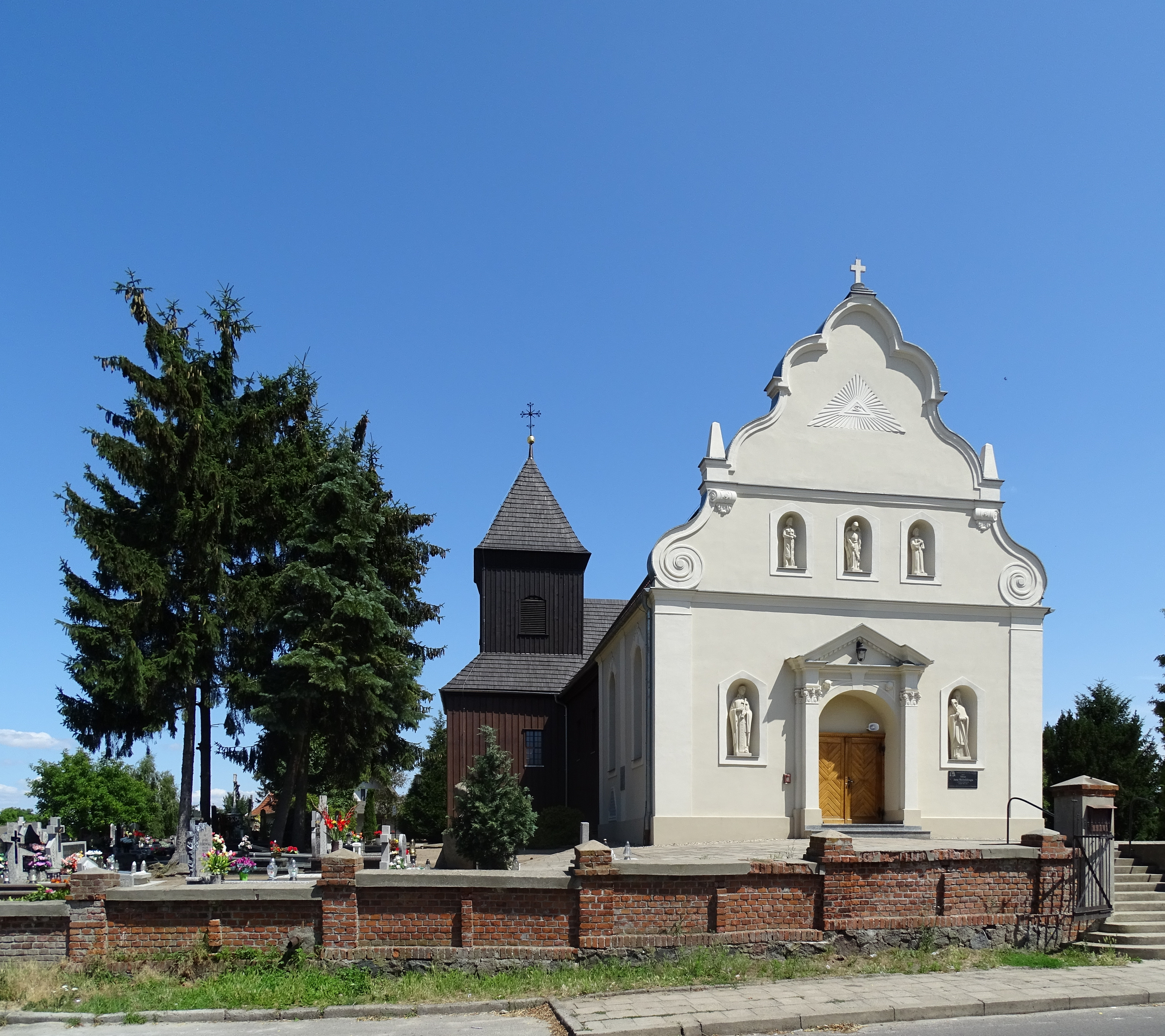
- Parish Church of Saint James

- Location within Poland
- Coordinates: 52°27′50″N 17°40′49″E
- Country: Poland
- Voivodeship: Greater Poland
- County: Gniezno
- Gmina: Niechanowo

Population
  - Total: 2,300
- Climate: Dfb
- Website: http://www.niechanowo.pl

Niechanowo [ɲɛxaˈnɔvɔ] is a village in Gniezno County, Greater Poland Voivodeship, in west-central Poland. It is the seat of the gmina (administrative district) called Gmina Niechanowo.
