= Kędzierzyn, Greater Poland Voivodeship =

Kędzierzyn
- Village
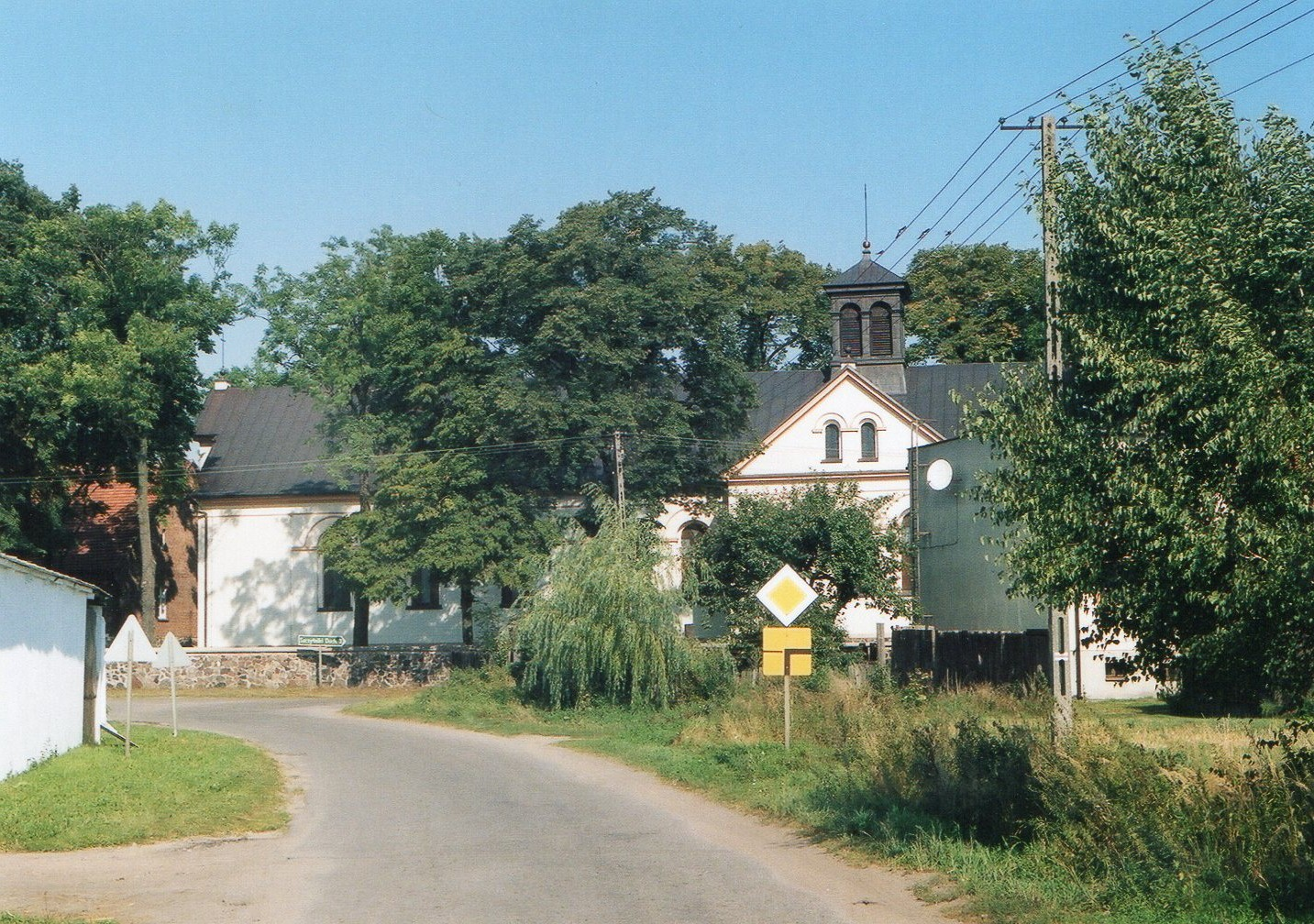

- Location within Poland
- Coordinates: 52°30′N 17°41′E
- Country: Poland
- Voivodeship: Greater Poland
- County: Gniezno
- Gmina: Niechanowo
- Time zone: UTC+1 (CET)
  - Summer (DST): UTC+2 (CEST)
- Vehicle registration: PGN

Kędzierzyn [kɛnˈd͡ʑɛʐɨn] is a village in the administrative district of Gmina Niechanowo, within Gniezno County, Greater Poland Voivodeship, in west-central Poland.

== History ==
Kędzierzyn was a private church village, administratively located in the Gniezno County in the Kalisz Voivodeship in the Greater Poland Province of the Polish Crown.

During the German occupation of Poland (World War II), in 1940, the occupiers carried out expulsions of Poles, who were deported in freight trains to the General Government (German-occupied central Poland), while their farms were then handed over to Germans as part of the Lebensraum policy.
