= Świlcza =

- Village
- Location within Poland
- Coordinates: 50°4′N 21°55′E
- Country: Poland
- Voivodeship: Subcarpathian
- County: Rzeszów
- Gmina: Świlcza
- Population: 3,000

Świlcza [ˈɕfilt͡ʂa] is a village in Rzeszów County, Subcarpathian Voivodeship, in south-eastern Poland. It is the seat of the gmina (administrative district) called Gmina Świlcza.
