= Rudna Wielka, Podkarpackie Voivodeship =

Rudna Wielka
- Village
- Location within Poland
- Coordinates: 50°5′0″N 21°57′0″E
- Country: Poland
- Voivodeship: Subcarpathian
- County: Rzeszów
- Gmina: Świlcza
- Population: 1,300

Rudna Wielka [ˈrudna ˈvjɛlka] is a village in the administrative district of Gmina Świlcza, within Rzeszów County, Subcarpathian Voivodeship, in south-eastern Poland.
