= Mikołajewice, Greater Poland Voivodeship =

Mikołajewice
- Village
- Location within Poland
- Coordinates: 50°17′52″N 17°4′11″E
- Country: Poland
- Voivodeship: Greater Poland
- County: Gniezno
- Gmina: Niechanowo

Mikołajewice [mikɔwajɛˈvit͡sɛ] is a village in the administrative district of Gmina Niechanowo, within Gniezno County, Greater Poland Voivodeship, in west-central Poland.
