= Chekhov (surname) =

Chekhov (masculine, Russian: Чехов) or Chekhova (feminine, Russian: Чехова) is a Russian surname. It may be an ethnonymic surname derived from the word "чех", Czech person. Notable people with the surname include:

- Alexander Chekhov (1855–1913), Russian essayist, memoirist, and novelist, brother of Anton and father of Michael
- Anfisa Chekhova (born 1977), Russian actress, singer, and radio and television presenter
- Anton Chekhov (1860–1904), Russian playwright
- Maria Chekhova (1863–1957), Russian artist and teacher, sister of Anton
- Maria Chekhova (feminist) (1866–1934), Russian educator, feminist, and suffragette
- Michael Chekhov (1891–1955), Russian–American actor, author, director, and theatre practitioner, son of Alexander
- Nikolai Chekhov (1858–1889), Russian painter, brother of Anton
- Olga Chekhova (1897–1980), Russian–German actress, wife of Michael
- Valery Chekhov (born 1955), Russian chess grandmaster

== Fictional characters ==
- Pavel Chekov, Star Trek character
- Chekov, fictional character in Stargate SG-1
