= Chekhovsky (rural locality) =

Chekhovsky (Russian: Че́ховский; masculine), Chekhovskaya (Че́ховская; feminine), or Chekhovskoye (Че́ховское; neuter) is the name of several rural localities in Russia:

- Chekhovsky, Moscow Oblast, a settlement in Luchinskoye Rural Settlement of Istrinsky District of Moscow Oblast
- Chekhovsky, Oryol Oblast, a settlement in Zhdimirsky Selsoviet of Znamensky District of Oryol Oblast
- Chekhovskoye, a selo in Alexandrovsk-Sakhalinsky District of Sakhalin Oblast
