= Bratkowice =

- Village
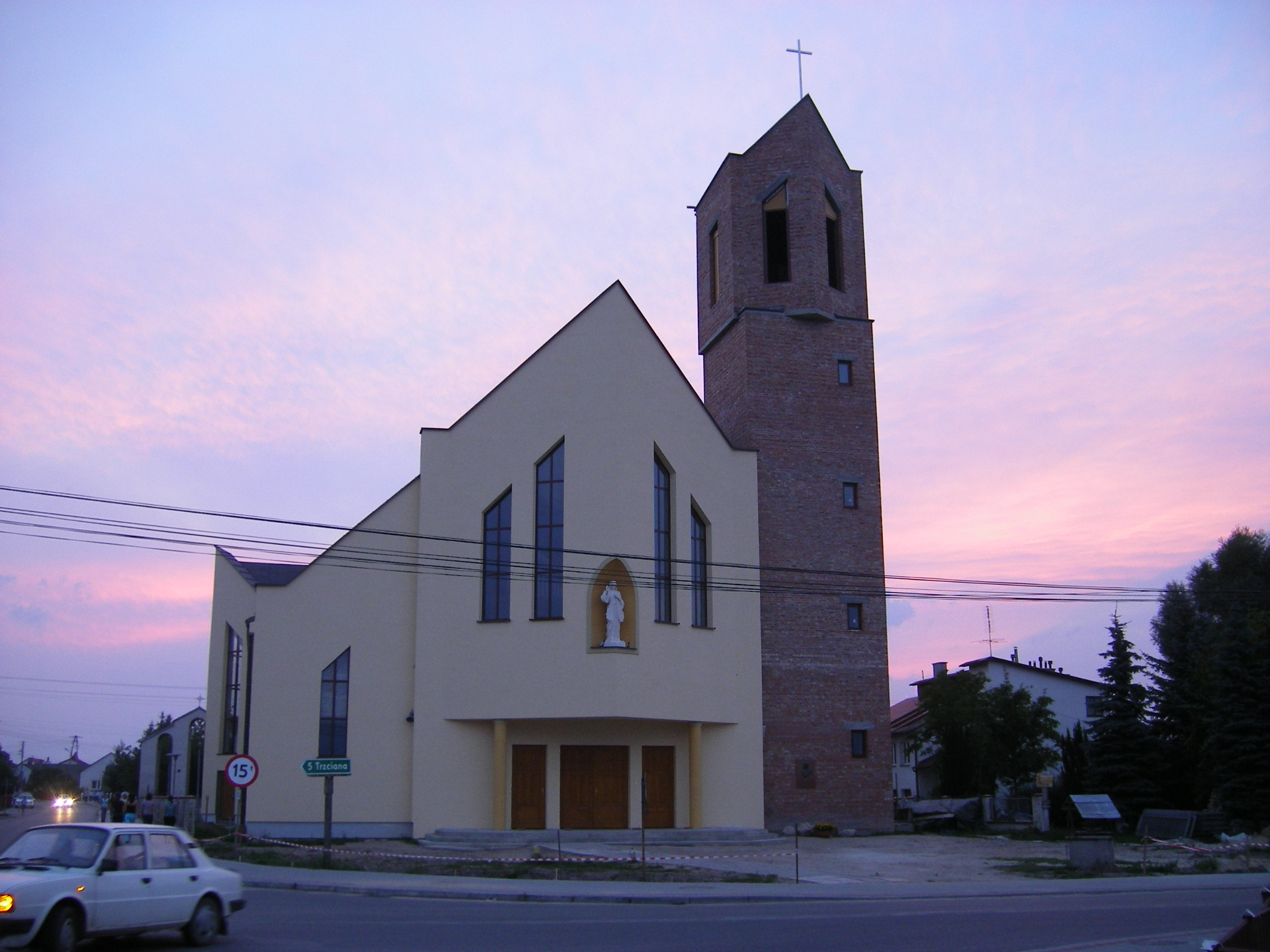
- Church of Saint John the Baptist

- Location within Poland
- Coordinates: 50°7′N 21°52′E
- Country: Poland
- Voivodeship: Subcarpathian
- County: Rzeszów
- Gmina: Świlcza

Population
  - Total: 4,100

Bratkowice ([bratkɔˈvit͡sɛ]) is a village in the administrative district of Gmina Świlcza, within Rzeszów County, Subcarpathian Voivodeship, in south-eastern Poland.
