= Maria Chekhova (feminist) =

Russian suffragette and educator (1866–1934)

Maria Aleksandrovna Argamakova Chekhova
- Born: 18 January 1866; St Petersburg, Russian Empire
- Died: 8 April 1934 (aged 68); Moscow, Soviet Union
- Occupations: Feminist, suffragette, and educator
- Spouse: Nikolai Chekhov

Maria Aleksandrovna Chekhova, née Argamakova, (18 January 1866 – 8 April 1934) was a Russian socialist feminist, suffragette and educator. She was a founder of the Women's Equal Rights Union (Soiuz Ravnopraviia Zhenshchin) in 1905 and organized petitions for women's suffrage that were submitted to the State Duma (Parliament). She edited the journal of the Union of Women (Soiuz Zhenshchin) for several years and served on the organizing committee of the first All-Russian Women's Congress in 1908.

== Life ==
Chekhova was born on 18 January 1866 in St Petersburg, the capital of the Russian Empire. Her mother died when she was six years old and her father remarried in 1877. When her father was transferred to Irkutsk in Siberia three years later, she was happy to live with her grandmother and remain in St Petersburg until her marriage with Nikolai Chekhov in 1890. In the meantime, Chekhova graduated from teacher's courses in 1886 with a major in mathematics. She founded her own school in St Petersburg in 1889 which lasted until 1916. The Chekhovs spent the years 1890 to 1904 living in the provinces where they established several schools and had four daughters and three sons. They moved to Moscow in 1904 where they joined the local teachers' union.

== Work ==
The beginning of 1905 Russian Revolution allowed ordinary citizens to demand for the right to vote, but male liberals were mostly concerned about securing the right to vote for men, without spending any political capital on the same right for women. Chekhova helped to found the Women's Equal Rights Union in February 1905 and was its secretary and sat on its central bureau while her husband was the only man on the bureau.
