= Czechowo, Greater Poland Voivodeship =

Czechowo
- Village
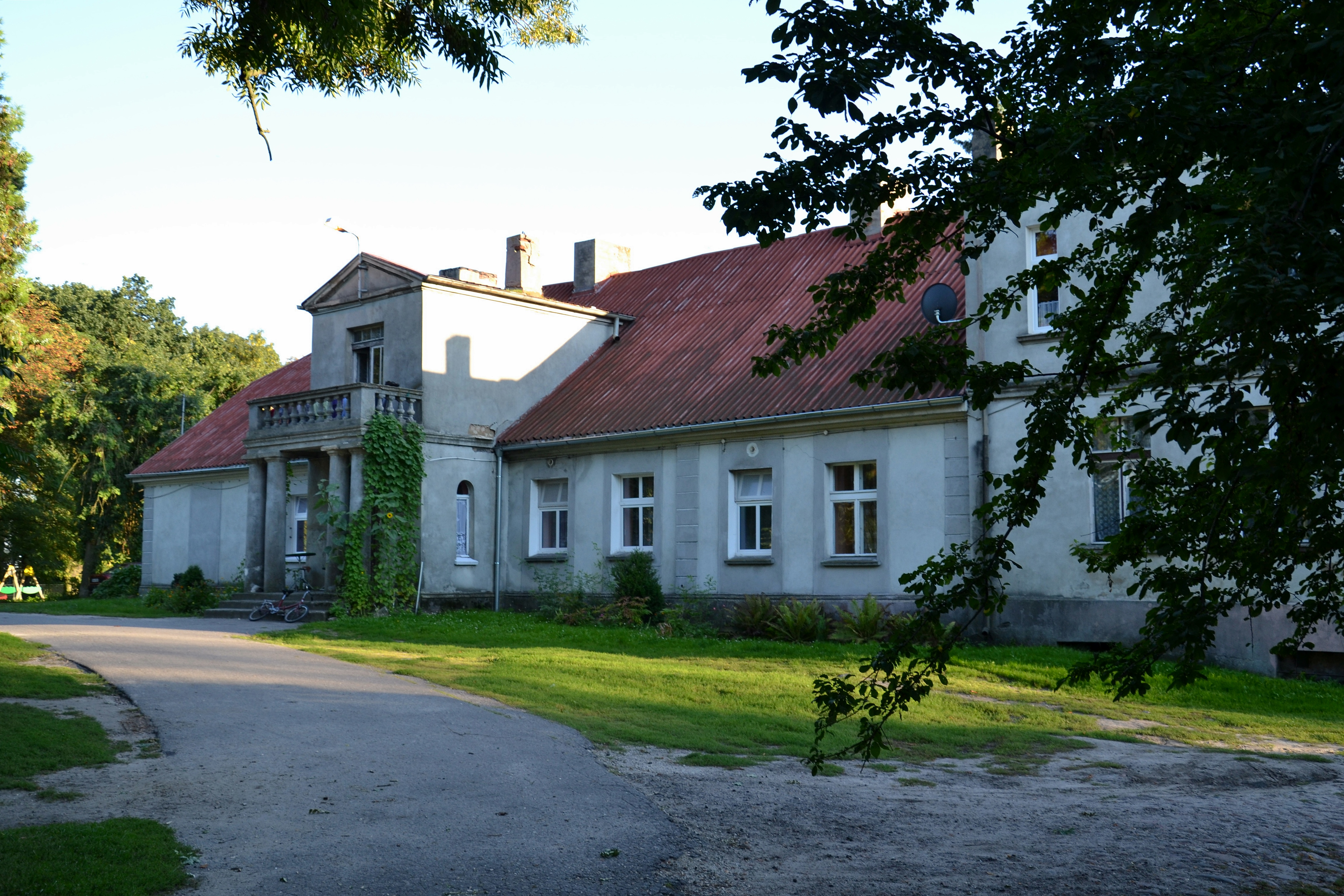
- Manor in the village

- Location within Poland
- Coordinates: 52°25′N 17°38′E
- Country: Poland
- Voivodeship: Greater Poland
- County: Gniezno
- Gmina: Niechanowo

Czechowo [t͡ʂɛˈxɔvɔ] is a village in the administrative district of Gmina Niechanowo, within Gniezno County, Greater Poland Voivodeship, in west-central Poland.
