= Czechowicz =

Czechowicz (Polish pronunciation: [tʂɛˈxɔvitʂ]) is a surname of Polish-language origin, meaning "son of the Czech". It is related to Belarusian Chakhovich or Čachovič (Belarusian: Чаховіч), Ukrainian Chekhovych (Ukrainian: Чехович), and Russian Chekhovich (Russian: Чехович). Notable people with the surname include:

- Gabriel Czechowicz (1876–1938), Polish lawyer, economist and politician
- Józef Czechowicz (1903–1939), Polish poet
- Juliusz Czechowicz (1894–1974), Polish painter
- Mieczysław Czechowicz (1930–1991), Polish actor
- Szymon Czechowicz (1689–1775), Polish painter of the Baroque

\\
