= Błędowa Zgłobieńska =

- Village
- Location within Poland
- Coordinates: 50°02′16″N 21°50′16″E
- Country: Poland
- Voivodeship: Subcarpathian
- County: Rzeszów
- Gmina: Świlcza
- Population: 550

Błędowa Zgłobieńska ([bwɛnˈdɔva zɡwɔˈbjɛɲska]) is a village in the administrative district of Gmina Świlcza, within Rzeszów County, Subcarpathian Voivodeship, in south-eastern Poland.
