= Stanisław Kamocki =

Polish painter

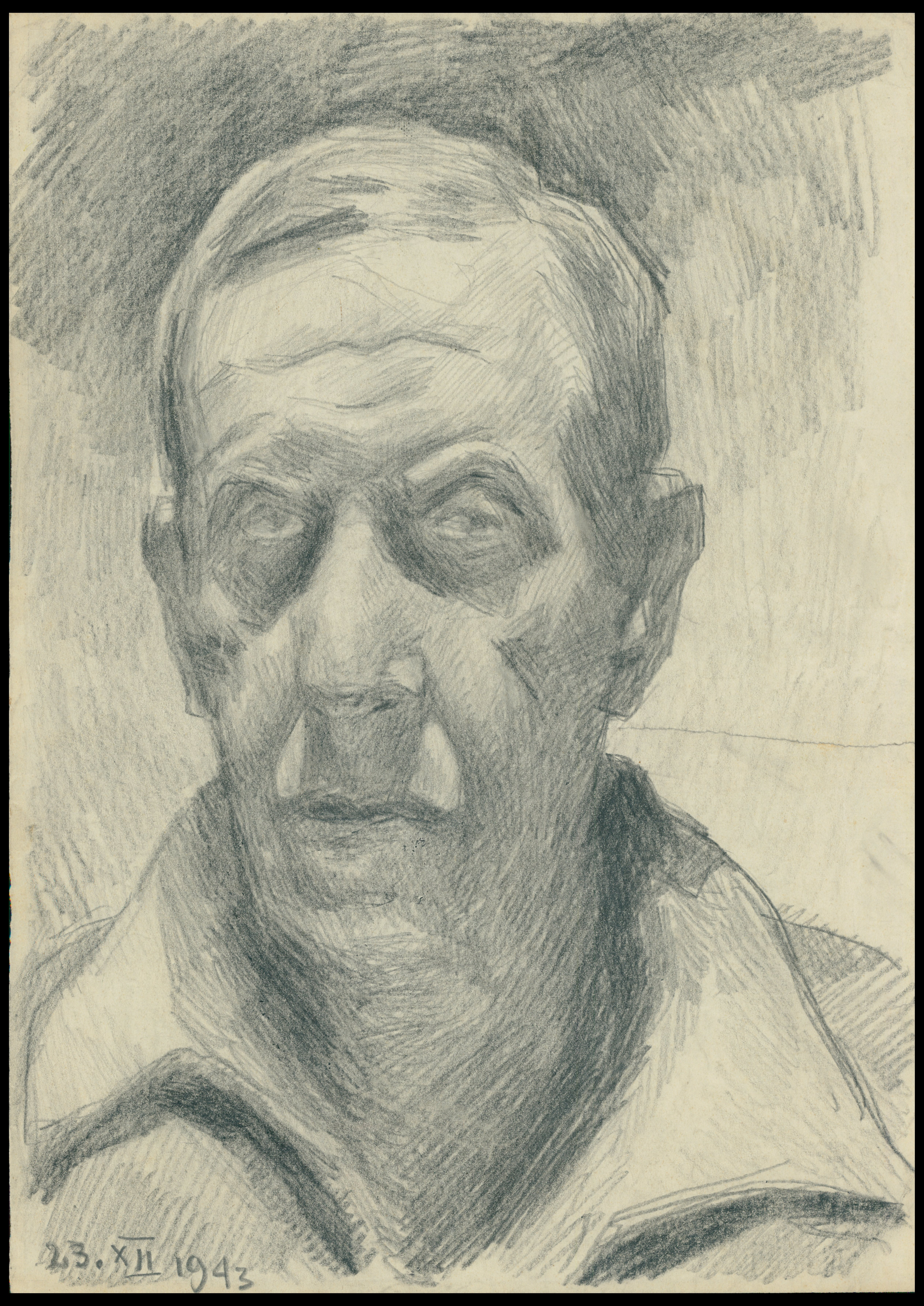
Self-portrait of Stanisław Kamocki (1943)

Stanisław Kamocki (1875–1944) was a Polish painter.
