= Chekhov (inhabited locality) =

Chekhov (Russian: Че́хов) is the name of several inhabited localities in Russia.

Urban localities

- Chekhov, Moscow Oblast, a town in Chekhovsky District of Moscow Oblast

Rural localities

- Chekhov, Bryansk Oblast, a settlement in Dobrodeyevsky Selsoviet of Zlynkovsky District of Bryansk Oblast
- Chekhov, Sakhalin Oblast, a selo in Kholmsky District of Sakhalin Oblast
