= Czechów, Lubusz Voivodeship =

Czechów
- Village
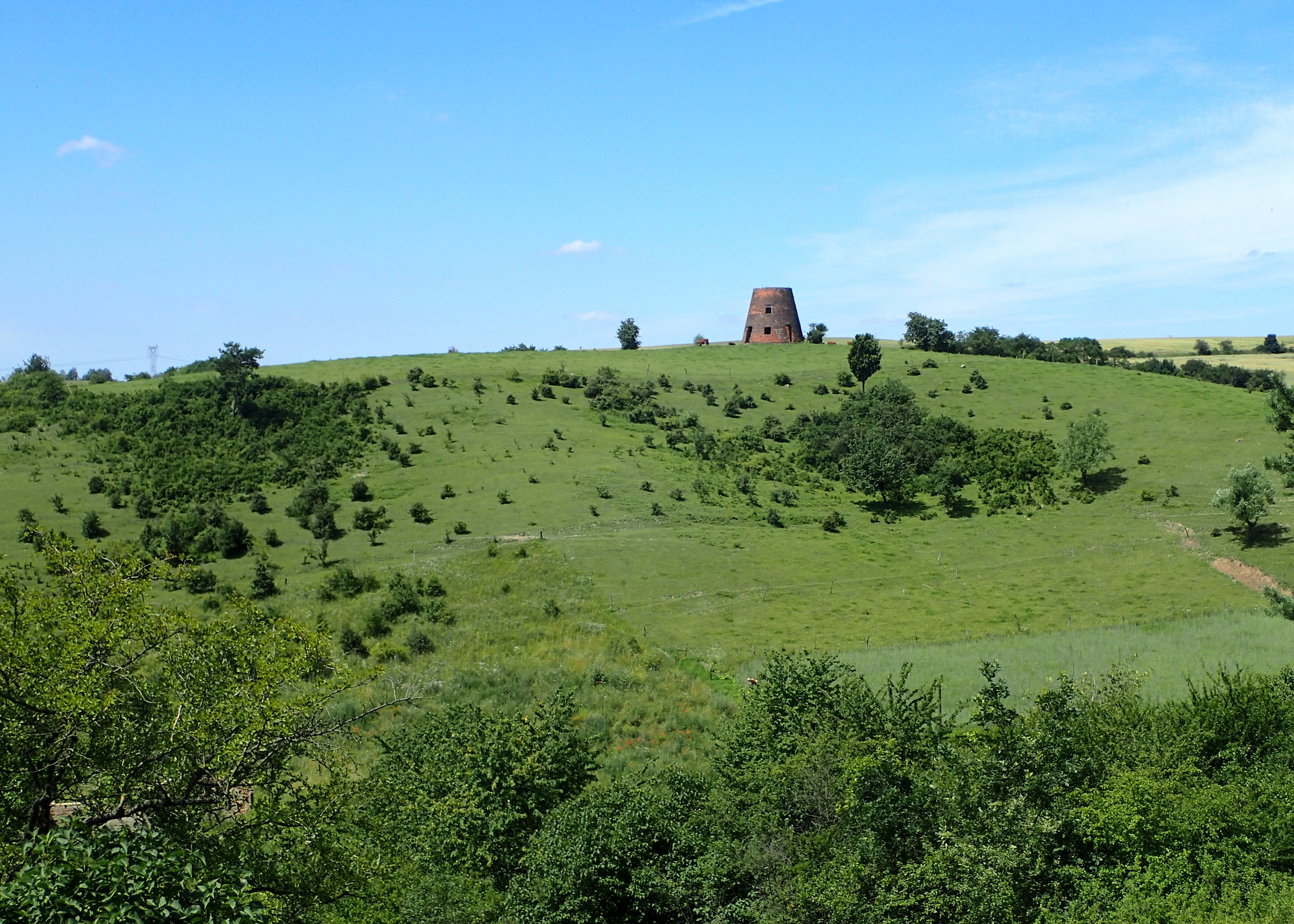

- Location within Poland
- Coordinates: 52°43′N 15°18′E
- Country: Poland
- Voivodeship: Lubusz
- County: Gorzów
- Gmina: Santok

Population
  - Total: 370
- Time zone: UTC+1 (CET)
  - Summer (DST): UTC+2 (CEST)
- Postal code: 66-431
- Vehicle registration: FGW

Czechów ([ˈt͡ʂɛxuf]) is a village in the administrative district of Gmina Santok, within Gorzów County, Lubusz Voivodeship, in western Poland. It is situated on the Warta River, approximately 9 km (6 mi) west of Santok and 4 km (2 mi) south-east of Gorzów Wielkopolski.
