= Czechów, Świętokrzyskie Voivodeship =

Czechów
- Village
- Location within Poland
- Coordinates: 50°34′45″N 20°34′51″E
- Country: Poland
- Voivodeship: Świętokrzyskie
- County: Pińczów
- Gmina: Kije

Czechów [ˈt͡ʂɛxuf] is a village in the administrative district of Gmina Kije, within Pińczów County, Świętokrzyskie Voivodeship, in south-central Poland. It lies approximately 4 km (2 mi) south of Kije, 7 km (4 mi) north-east of Pińczów, and 34 km (21 mi) south of the regional capital Kielce.
