= Bieliński Palace, Otwock Wielki =

Palace at Otwock Wielki Otwock Grand Palace Jeziorskich Family Palace Bielińskich Family Palace
- pałac Jeziorskich w Otwocku Wielkim pałac Bielińskich w Otwocku Wielkim
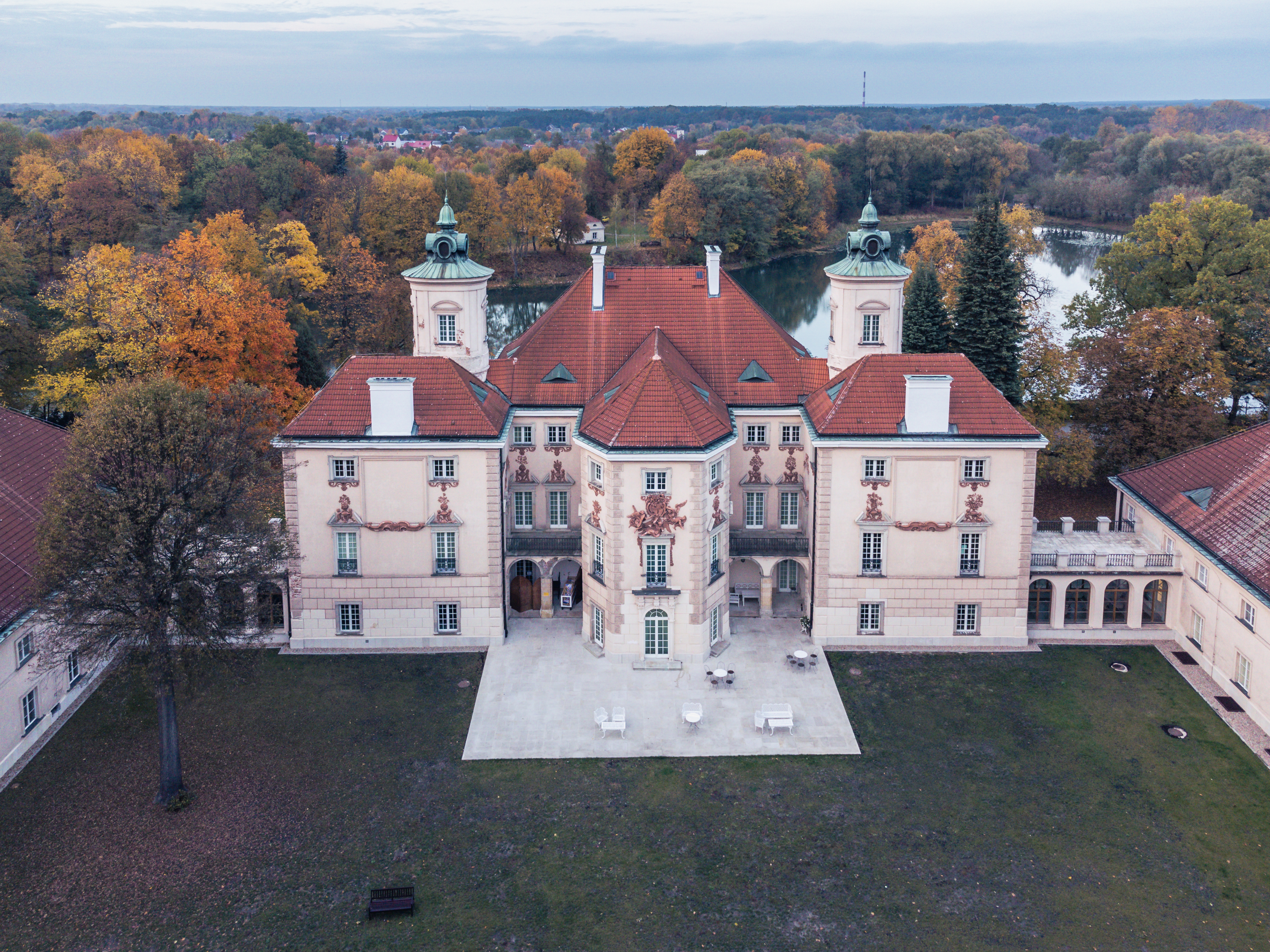

- Location within Poland Location within Masovian Voivodeship

General information
- Type: Palace
- Architectural style: Classicist architecture
- Location: Otwock Wielki, southeast of Warsaw, Poland, Poland
- Coordinates: 52°02′27.51″N 21°14′41.4″E
- Construction started: 1682
- Completed: 1689

Website
- Official page of the Museum of Interiors now housed at the palace (in Polish); Pałac Bielińskich w Otwocku Wielkim on Facebook (in Polish)

Palace at Otwock Wielki or Otwock Grand Palace is otherwise known as the Jezierski Family palace (Polish: Pałac Jezierskich) or Bieliński Family palace (Polish: Pałac Bielińskich). It is a historic palatial residence located on an artificial island in an oxbow lake of the River Vistula in Otwock Wielki, in the gmina Karczew, powiat otwocki, masovian Voivodeship.

It is the former summer home of the Bieliński family, old aristocracy (szlachta) from Ciechanów County in Mazovia, who maintained a close relationship with the Saxon court. But the family heirs squandered the family wealth in the 18th century, and the palace became in the end closely associated with the Jezierscy family szlachta, following the palace's acquisition by Jacek Jezierski. It remained in the hands of that family until the communist period of 1945 -1989. Recently, a court tort case has led to an administrative decision by the mazovian Voivode to return the property to the rightful Jezierski heirs. Nonetheless, the palace remains on public view, having been restored and opened to the public as Muzeum Wnętrz (Interiors Museum/Museum of Design in Otwock), a satellite branch of the National Museum, Warsaw.

== History ==
People in the Palace History

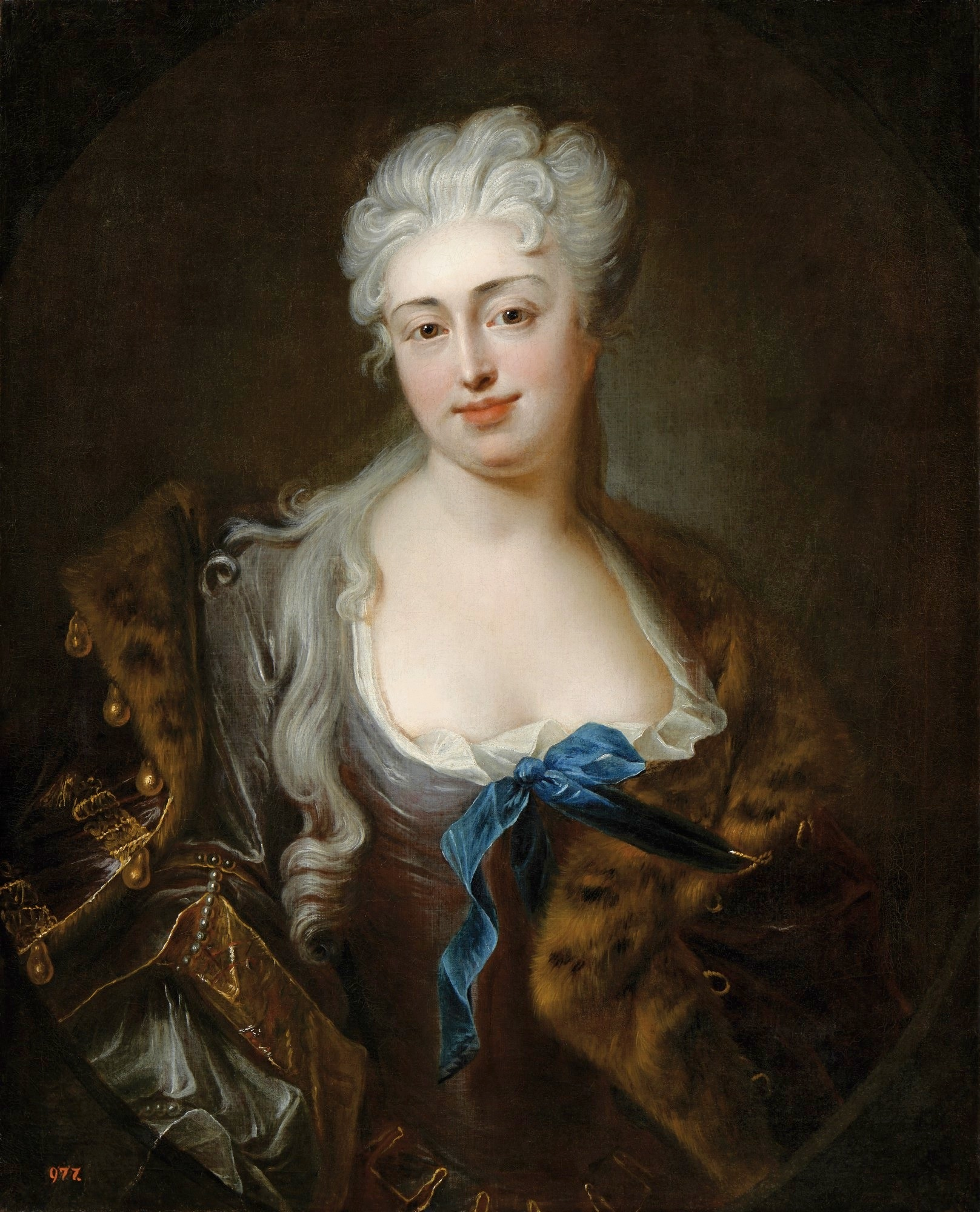
Marianna Denhoff, née Bielińska, daughter of Kazmierz Bieliński

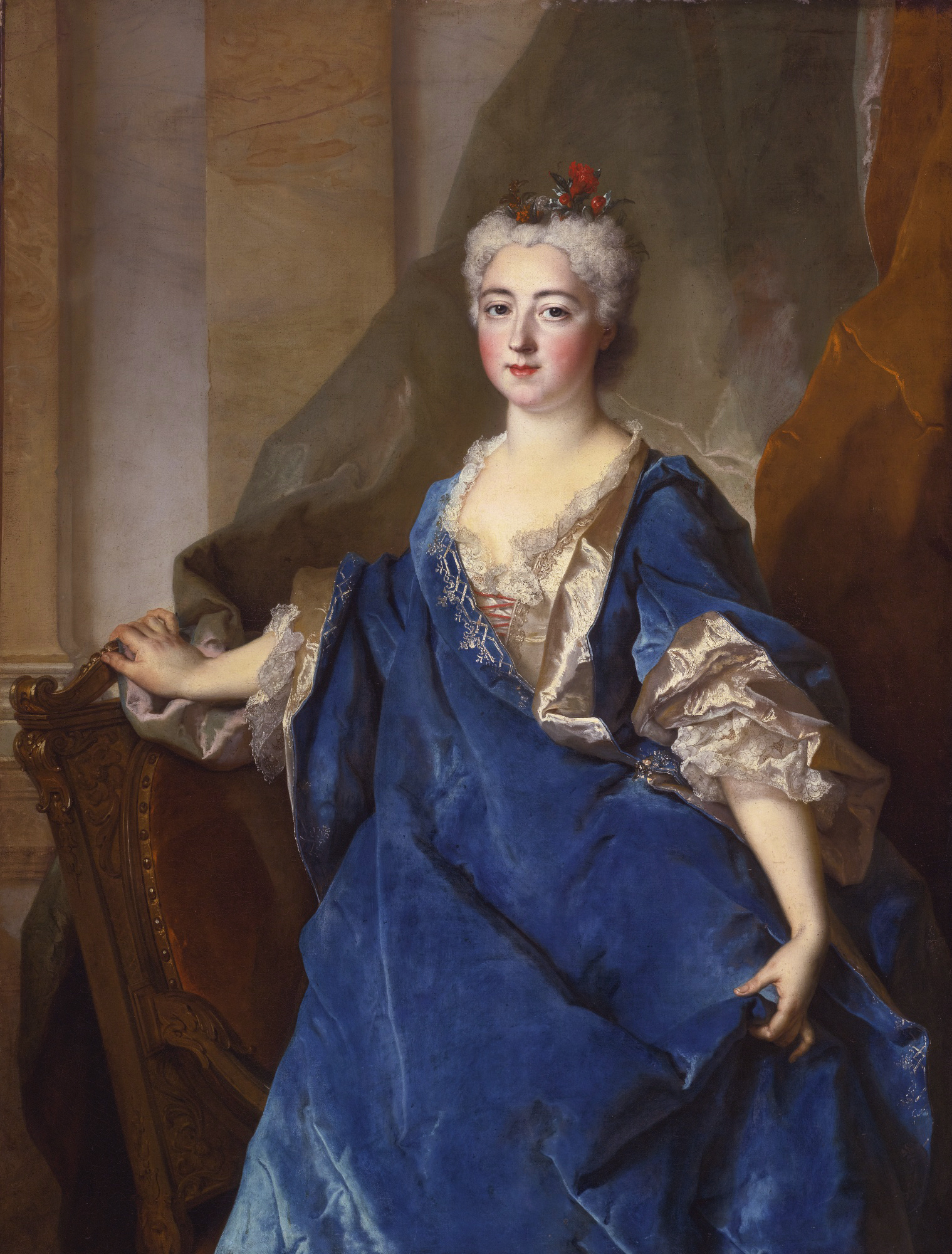
Katarzyna Bielińska, mother of Pierre Victor, Baron de Besenval de Brunstatt, by Nicolas de Largillière, 1720

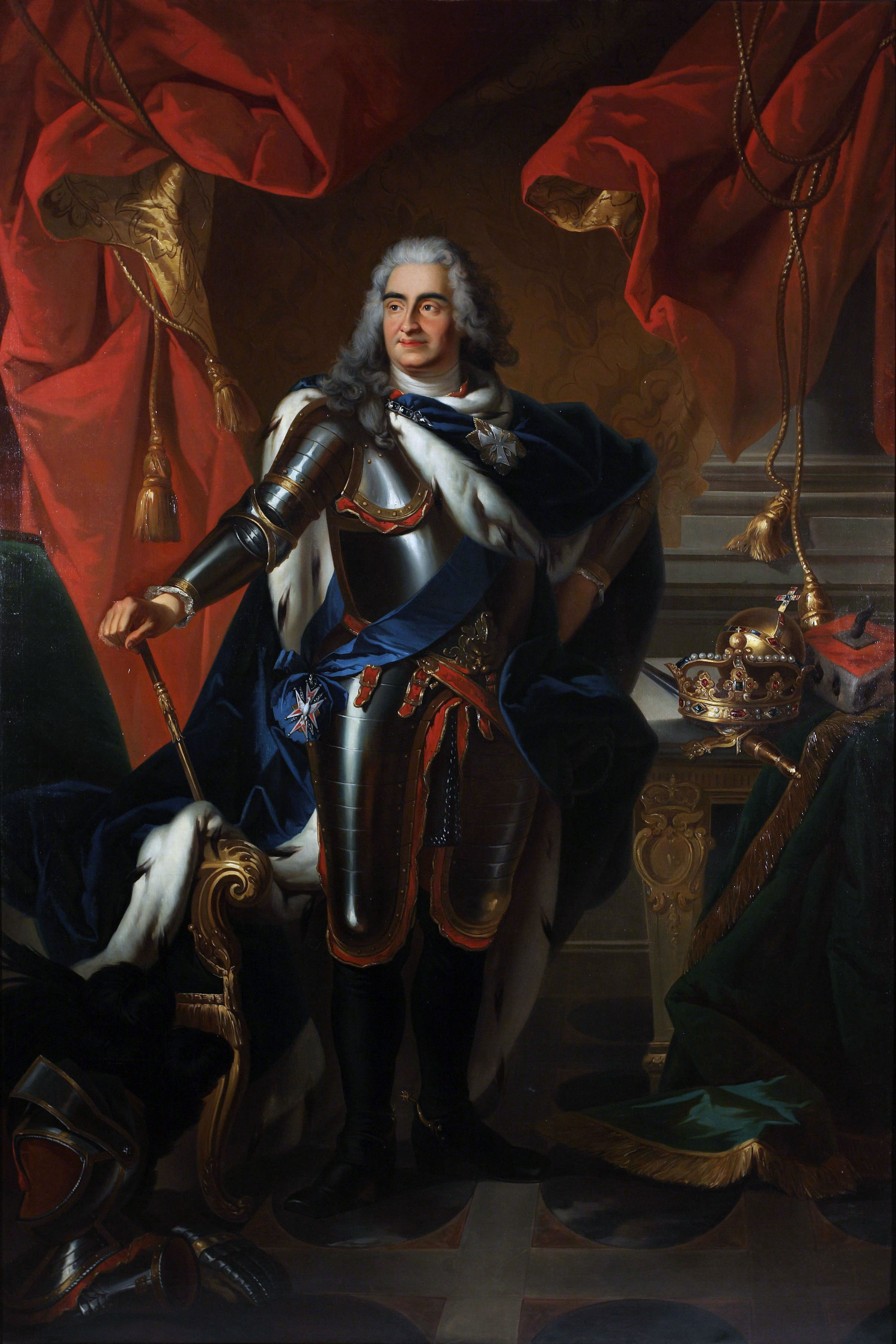
Augustus the Strong, by Henryk Rodakowski - Lviv National Art Gallery

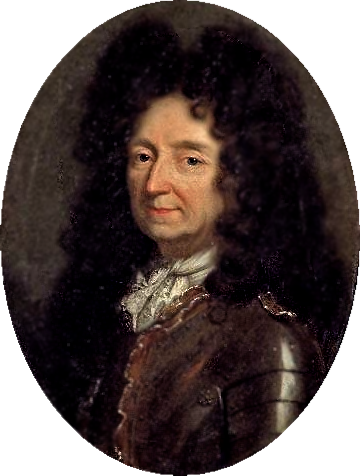
Jan Andrzej Morsztyn

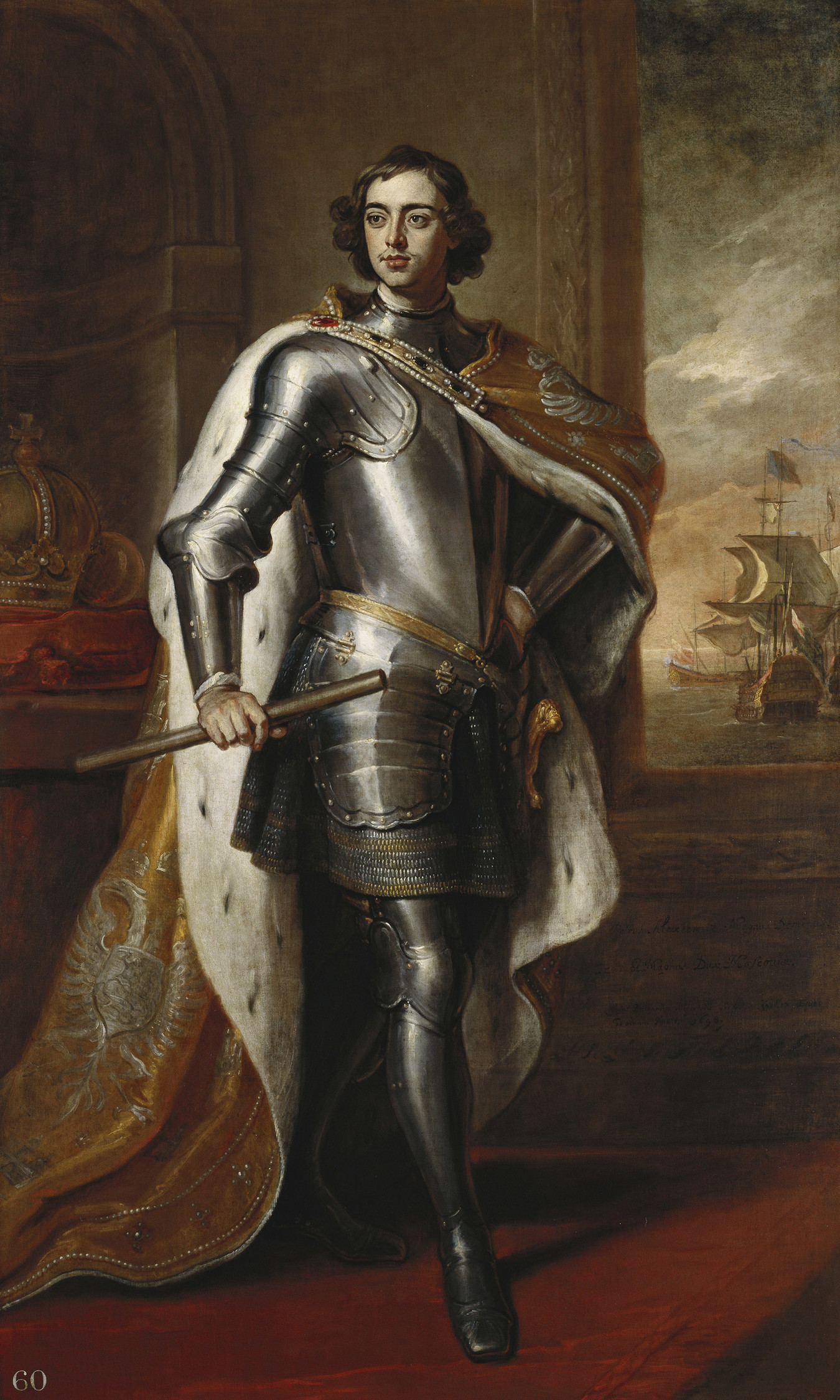
Peter the Great by Godfrey Kneller, 1698

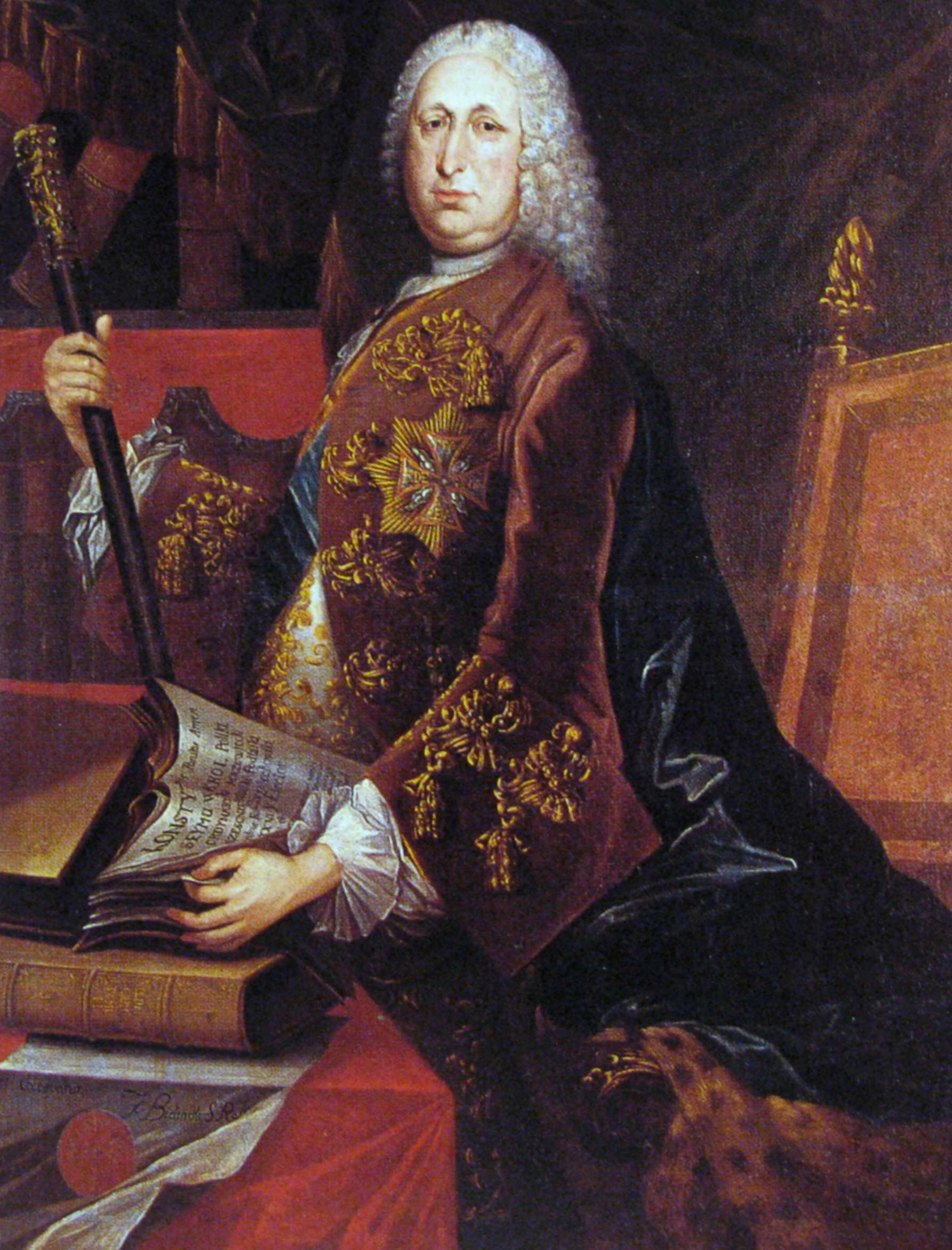
Franciszek Bieliński

At the time of its construction, the building was one of the most magnificent residences in mazovian Voivodeship, second only to the Royal Wilanów Palace among the most notable landmark estates of Poland. It had belonged to the Grand Marshal of the Crown Kazimierz Bieliński, having been designed in 1682 on the occasion of his wedding with Louise Morsztyn (Luiza Morsztynówna in Polish), daughter of Jan Andrzej Morsztyn, state treasurer and well-known poet. Construction began in 1682 and ended in 1689. Furnishing and decorating took nearly a decade longer, until the turn of the next century, probably August 1703.

The founder of this palace was Kazimierz Bielińsk, the only son of the governor of Malbork County, Franciszek Jan Bieliński. Members of that Ciechanów County szlachta comprised bishops who were also senators in the Sejm, remaining in a close power-sharing relationship with the royal court of the Saxons. Kazimierz Bieliński himself supported King Augustus II the Strong, who in 1702 made him Marshal of the Court, then promoted him to the office of Marshal of the Crown. In the same year the king visited the Marshal at his Otwock residence. Two years later, in 1705, King Augustus II hosted Tsar Peter the Great at the Otwock palace, and it is said that this is why the tsar allowed August II to remain on the Polish throne. It was at this meeting that Augustus II traitorously suggested a partition of Rzeczpospolita to the tsar, counting on personal gain and a part in the spoils. The king also had his own personal reasons frequently visit the Otwock estate. The owner's daughter, Marianna Denhoff née Bielińska, was a favorite of Augustus the Strong, which lent Kazimierz Beliński considerable influence on the two Saxon courts in Dresden and in Warsaw. The king for these reasons often entertained here – at feasts and hunts, especially arranged to take place for him. Another daughter, Katarzyna Bielińska (Catherine Bielinska), married the French ambassador, the baron of Brünstatt, Jean-Victor de Besenval. She was the widow of Jakub Potocki.

After the death of Kazimierz Bieliński in 1713, ownership of the palace passed to his 30-year-old son, Franciszek Bieliński, who went on to become Grand Marshal of the Crown. He had the streets of Warsaw cleaned and paved (23 kilometres (14 mi)), and had installed the first public street lighting. Still other public improvements were made in Warsaw and Czersk on his initiative. To memorialize his contribution to Warsaw's public good, one of the main arteries of city was eventually named Ulica Marszałkowska (in English: Marshal Street). He also initiated a renovation of the palace in 1757, which moved the exterior staircases indoors and made other improvements to make it more suitable as a year-round residence rather than just a summer home. The two wings were also added at this time.

=== End of the 18th and 19th centuries ===
The palace was inherited by a nephew of the childless Franciszek Bieliński in 1766, his brother Michael's son, also named Franciszek. During the 1794 Kościuszko Uprising this nephew set an example of patriotism to his fellow countrymen by offering his Otwock possessions' entire harvest to the common folk gratis, while the capital lay starving, surrounded by the Prussian armies, running out of food.

But his younger brother, who managed the estate in waning years of the 18th century, squandered it. Otwock palace changed hands, and was pledged to Castellan Jacek Jezierski.

Paweł and Józef, Francis' sons, were the last of the Bieliński clan to reside at Otwock. Franciszek Bieliński died in 1809. The same year, the palace became a cantonment for General Michał Sokolnicki's army, on the eve of the Battle of Ostrówek. The night spent there by the troops before the battle, and the palace itself, have been immortalized in Polish literature by Stefan Żeromski in his national epic novel Popioły (in English: Ashes). Hostilities in the Napoleonic Wars between the Polish and Austrian armies caused huge damage in 1809 to the Otwock estate, sustained in particular during the Austrian crossing of the Vistula and the subsequent attack on Sokolnicki's force stationed there.

The palace ruins were auctioned off in May 1828. The new owner, Aleksander Stanisław Potocki, sold the palace a month later to merchant Jan Jerzy Kurtz, the appointed advisor for the province of Mazowsze. What was left of the palace remained under the care of the Kurtz family for three generations, while a young builder by the name Jan Teofil Sbarboni went about restoring it. Sbarboni most likely was not the creator of the palace redesign, but only played the role of a draftsman implementing the concepts of Leandro Marconi, one of the most distinguished architects in 19th century Poland. The restoration work was interrupted in 1857 by a sudden death of Aniela, the daughter of Jan Jerzy Kurtz, because her heir, son Zygmunt, one of the founders of the Warsaw Horticultural Society, chose other pursuits. Accordingly, in 1884 he planted a huge orchard of more than twenty thousand trees on the garden grounds, supplying the markets of Warsaw and St. Petersburg.

=== 20th century ===
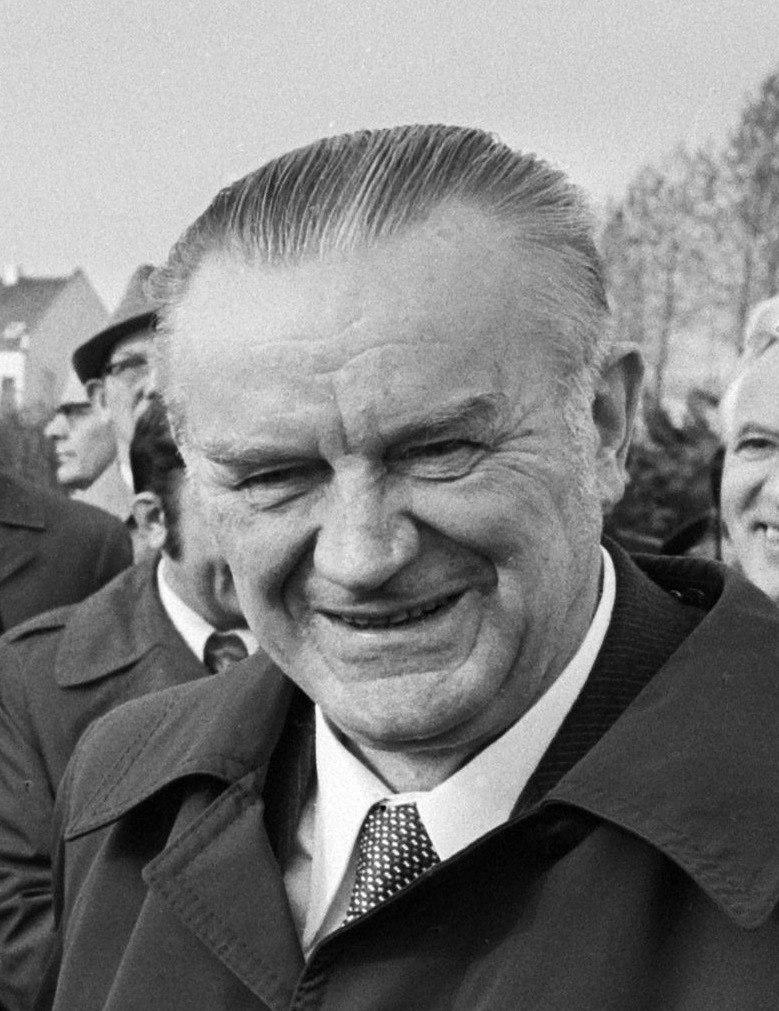
Piotr Jaroszewicz 1977

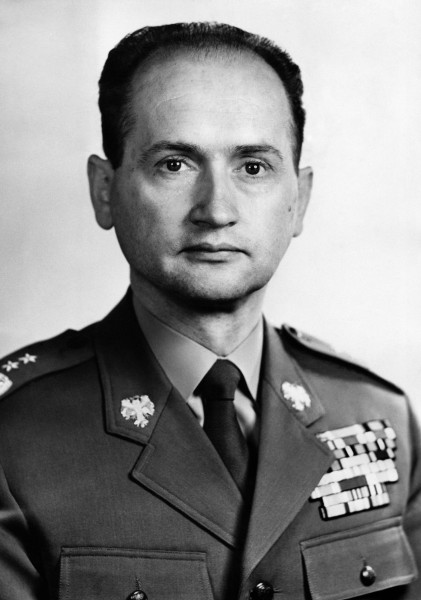
Wojciech Jaruzelski

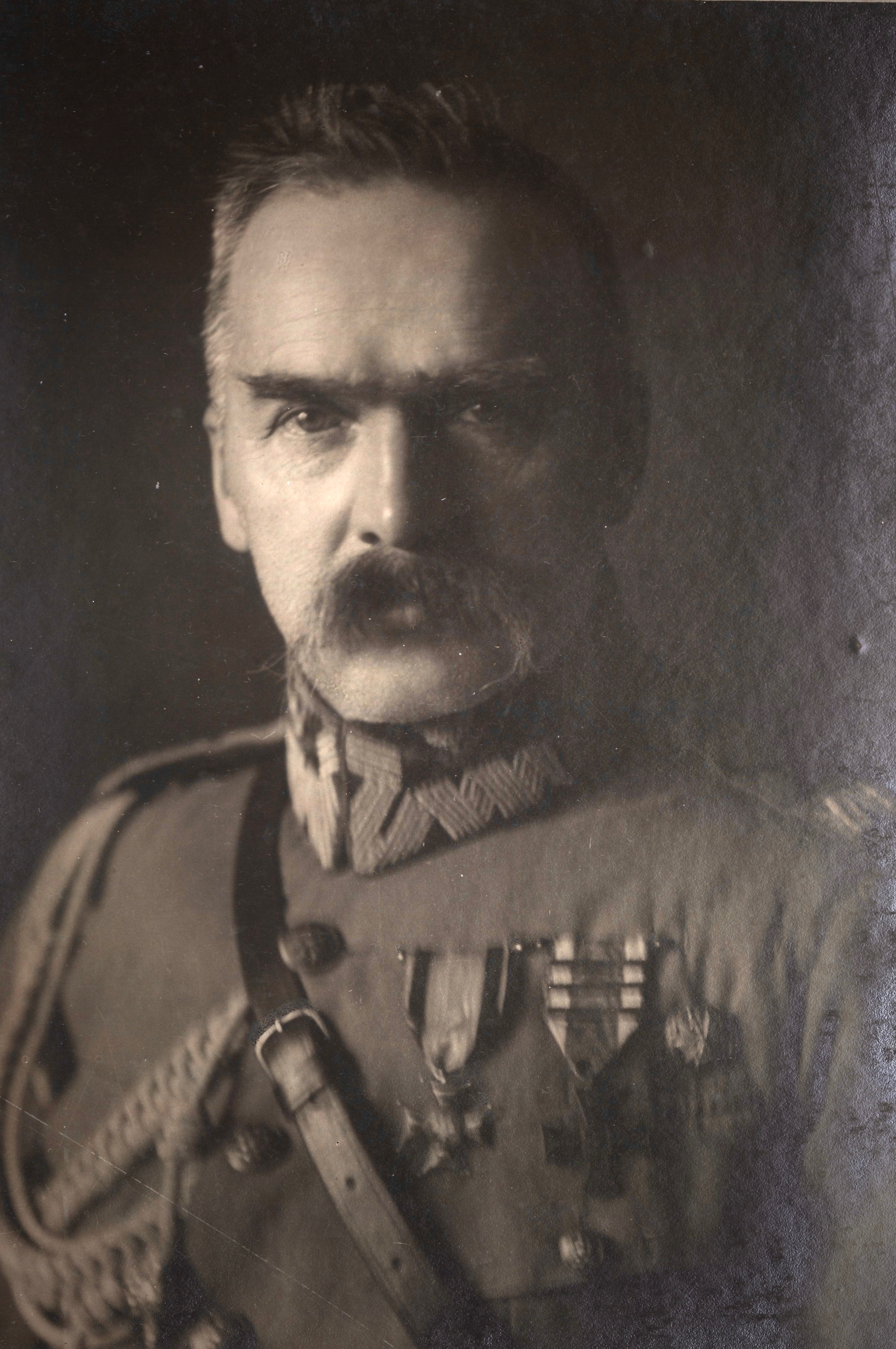
Józef Piłsudski

During World War I, German soldiers were posted at the palace, leading to looting and extensive damage. In 1918 the palace passed into the possession of a descendant of Jacek Jezierski, and remained in that family's hands until the end of World War II. The end of that era coincided with the communist takeover in post-World War II Poland, and the new authorities rudely repurposed the Otwock Wielki palace as a reformatory home for girls, a kind of minimum security prison for troubled or orphaned teens. It was an extremely significant and misguided decision. This led to many interior changes for the worse; moreover, the priceless 17th-century polychrome frescoes and other interior decorative elements suffered to no end at the close sustained proximity to the "inmates".

Restoration during the communist rule did eventually take place. An effort was made in the 1970s: The palace was taken over by the Office of the Council of Ministers and redone to function as a showcase government facility. Prime Minister Piotr Jaroszewicz in 1975 decided to make it a residence for foreign guests of the communist government. Later it was inhabited by General Wojciech Jaruzelski, who in contrast cared little for his reputation or for entertaining distinguished guests, but immediately went about improving the physical condition of the residence. Sudden variety and costly renovation was brought with the aforesaid decision. During martial law in Poland Lech Wałęsa was held in the palace. The place became a huge repository of paintings by Kossak, Artur Grottger, Jacek Malczewski, Henryk Siemiradzki, Józef Marian Chełmoński and many notable others, stashed away from the public by the men that governed the Polish People's Republic, unexposed to the public, including such important cultural legacy artifacts as a posthumous cast of Marshal Józef Piłsudski's face, or his original sabers, or his work desk from the Belweder palace, and many other items associated with the Marshal.

=== Architect ===
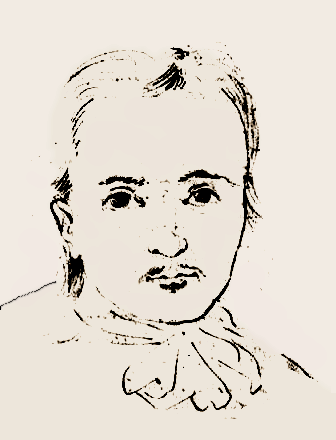
Architect Tylman van Gameran

Tylman van Gameren (1632–1706), a prominent Polish architect of Dutch origin, is likely the author of the master plan, which includes both the building and ancillary additions, as well as extensive landscape architecture. Architects Carlo Ceroni and Józef Fontana have also been mentioned in historical sources.

Van Gameren was related to Bieliński's kin by connections created on his assumptions performed for the group of people like Stanisław Herakliusz Lubomirski and Jan Dobrogost Krasiński, who had close relationships with this influential family. He also built the Saxon Palace in Warsaw, originally known as the Pałac Morsztynów or Morsztyn Palace, which was then purchased and enlarged by the first of Poland's two Saxon dynasty kings, Augustus II, father of the other. The Otwock Palace may be thought of as the Morsztyn Palace on steroids. Van Gameren also designed or reconstructed palaces in Białystok, and for the Ossoliński family, the Czartoryski family in Puławy, Lublin Voivodeship, as well as the Nieborów Palace, the Krasiński Palace on Krasiński Square in Warsaw, the Radziwiłł Palace in Warsaw, the Czapski Palace, the Marywil in Warsaw, and the Hermitage in St. Petersburg and the Łazienki Park complex: the Łazienki Palace, its proximate Łazienki Bridge, and the extensive old trees-laden Łazienki Park landscape as the setting, as well as the imposing Ujazdów Palace. Specific telltale signs reveal the palace in Otwock's Tylman bloodlines: a towering pediment filled with bas-relief decoration, the cornices, the drapery accommodation made through architectural embellishment, and the signature layout of the alcoves and of the two wing towers.

Decorative Detail on the Palace Exterior

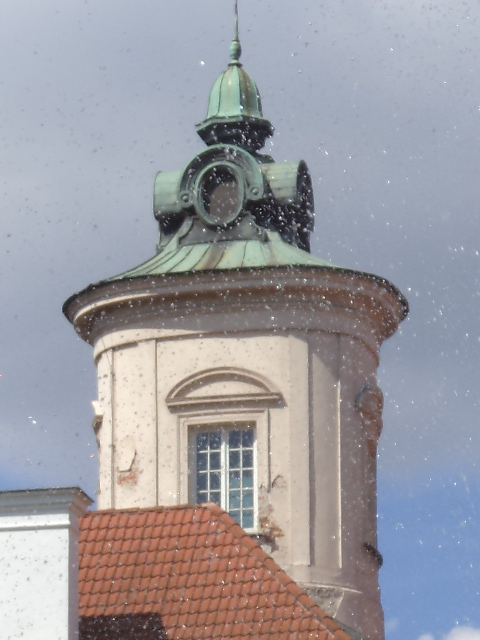

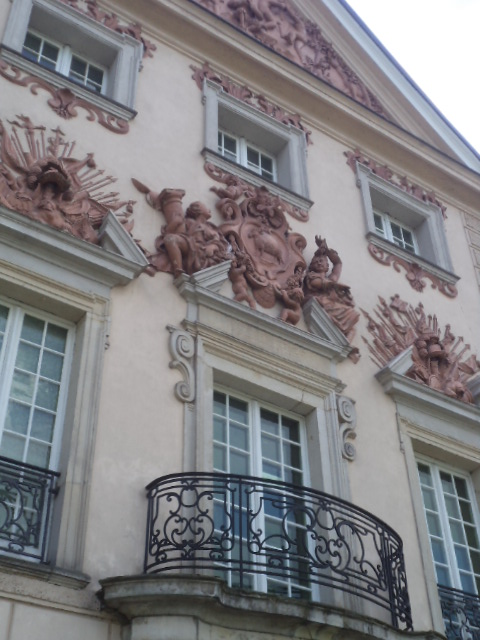

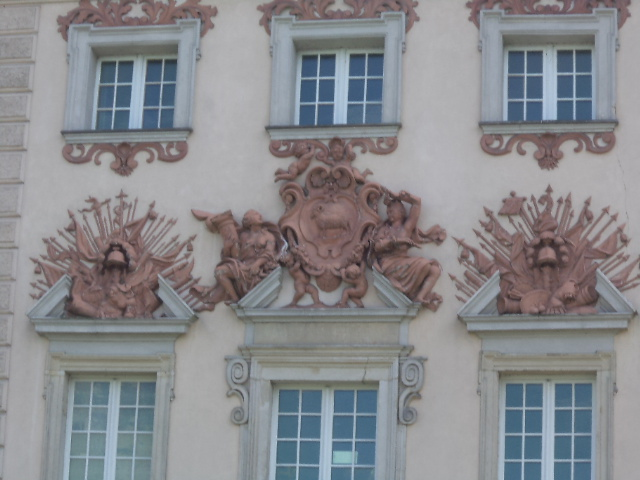

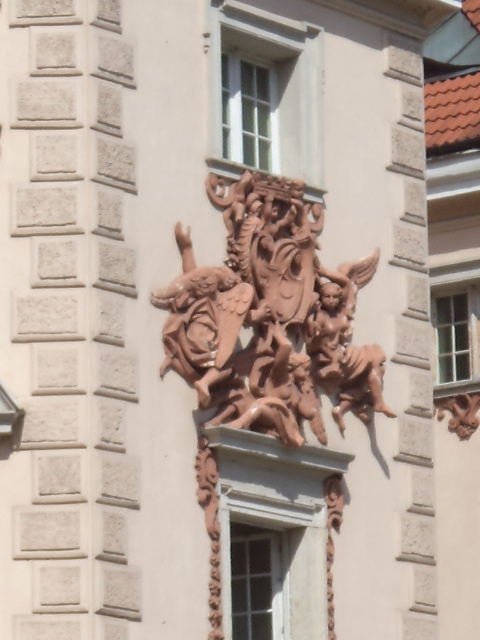

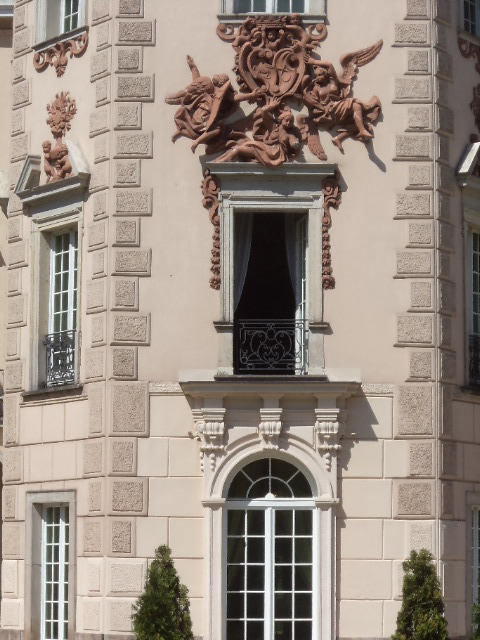

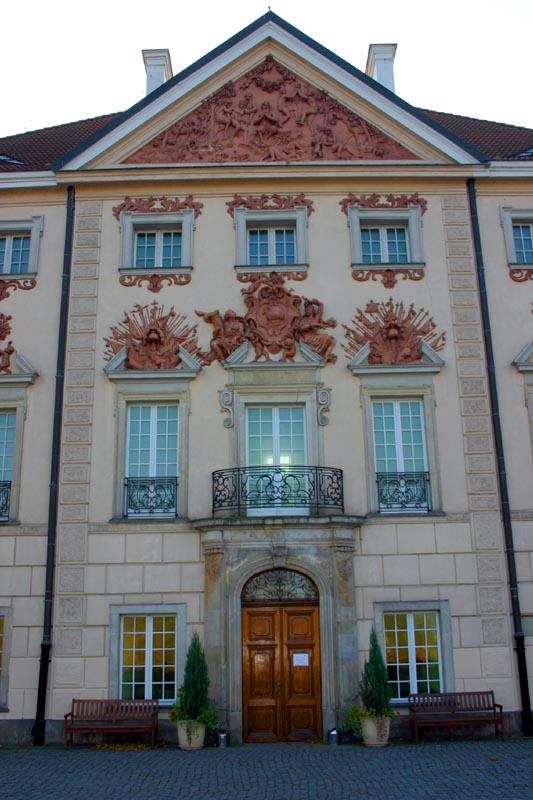

== Location, layout, construction and design ==
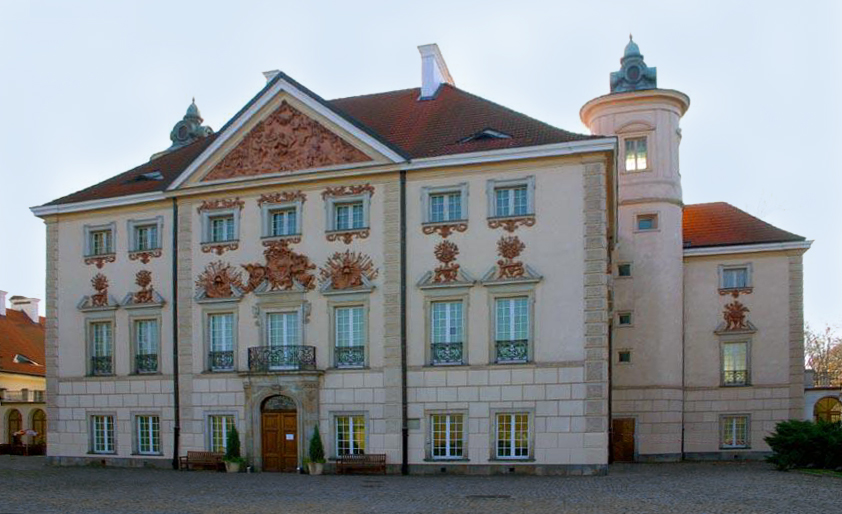
Close-up of the main edifice, front and center. Wings are not visible

The residence is located in Otwock Wielki, in a riverbank village setting, located southwest of Gmina Karczew on River Vistula, near a sandbar. After earthwork improvements, an oxbow in the river became "Lake Otwock", and the clump, a large island called Rokole Minor, with a picturesque manor house built off to the other side. In the center of the island was erected an impressive, three-story edifice on a rectangular footprint, with two characteristic oval towers and a protruding set of rectangular wings. The main entrance to the interior of the palace features a continuation in the form of a hallway leading to the sala terrana (in French). Around the villa a large park was landscaped, with great many mature trees planted at the end of the 18th century. An important element of the whole is the styling at roof-level of the front, which consists of a tympanum and a triangular pediment with decorated stucco in the style of Nicolas Poussin. The windows height features risalit at the middle floor. A heraldic cartouche of the Junosz coat of arms above the main entrance, hallmark of the Bieliński family, carries emblazoned the motto: Nolo Minor Me Timeat/Descipiciat Que Maior.

Władysław Łoziński described the works thus in his definitive account of Polish life across centuries issued in 1907: "a grim horror of fortified walls passes the visitor off into the lightness and charm of soft architectural lines, the oppressive solemnity of it all yielding to the coquetry of the decorative. In the time when the seventeenth century yielded to the eighteenth, some great pastoral residences sprung up on the Polish land, under our gray skies, upon our miserable landscape, scattered amongst the great mansions of nobles and the sorry thatched huts of peasants, as if a magic wand had been waved in the air, plopping them straight into our lap from the motherland of the Italian doge and the French marquess."

== Status today ==
Today the shape of the buildings does not differ much from the original, but many of the contents: the historic details, the furnishings, the landscape architecture – require reconstruction.

In early 2004, the palace passed under the permanent administration of the Ministry of Culture. In the same year under the lease agreement, the current curator of the facility became the National Museum in Warsaw, which set up its Museum of Interiors here. After much-needed scholarly renovations, the palace opened to the public on 7 July 2004.

June 8, 2005 featured another public unveiling, this time of additional interiors.

On the ground floor, visitors pass through a representative entryway and dining hall, then can admire the enfilade of rooms in the right wing furnished in the Baroque, Biedermeier and Classicist styles. The two Belweder rooms in the left wing have been restored in the setting contemporary to Marshal Józef Piłsudski.

A palatial staircase leads to the second floor. To the left a vestibule and a ballroom preserved in original condition currently serve as a music performance space. In the right wing, three rooms now feature furniture from the Classicist style period characteristic of the city of Vilnius. The bedrooms in the apartments on the third floor have elevated floors, allowing visitors to look out on the pastoral landscape of the river's oxbow. Three additional fresco-laden halls undergoing maintenance are currently off limits to the public.

An attached cafe has been erected as a convenience for visitors.

On the basis of a court judgment issued 26 February 2009, Jacek Kozlowski, governor of mazovian Voivodship, issued a decision, by which the Grand Palace in Otwock was handed over to the heirs of the family Jezierski. It remains unclear what this means for the museum function the building and its palatial gardens and grounds fulfill today.

== Gallery ==
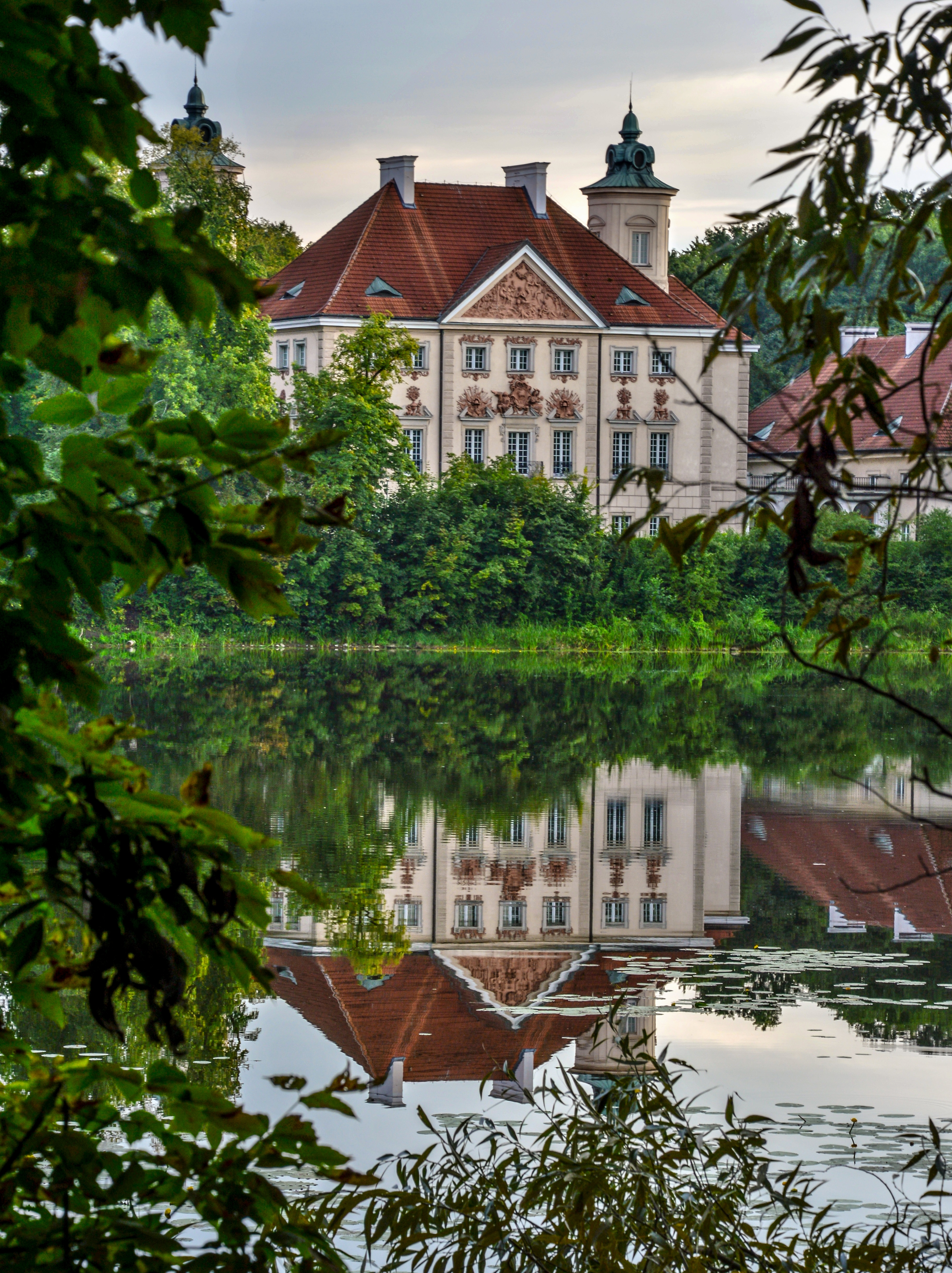
Otwock Wielki Palace

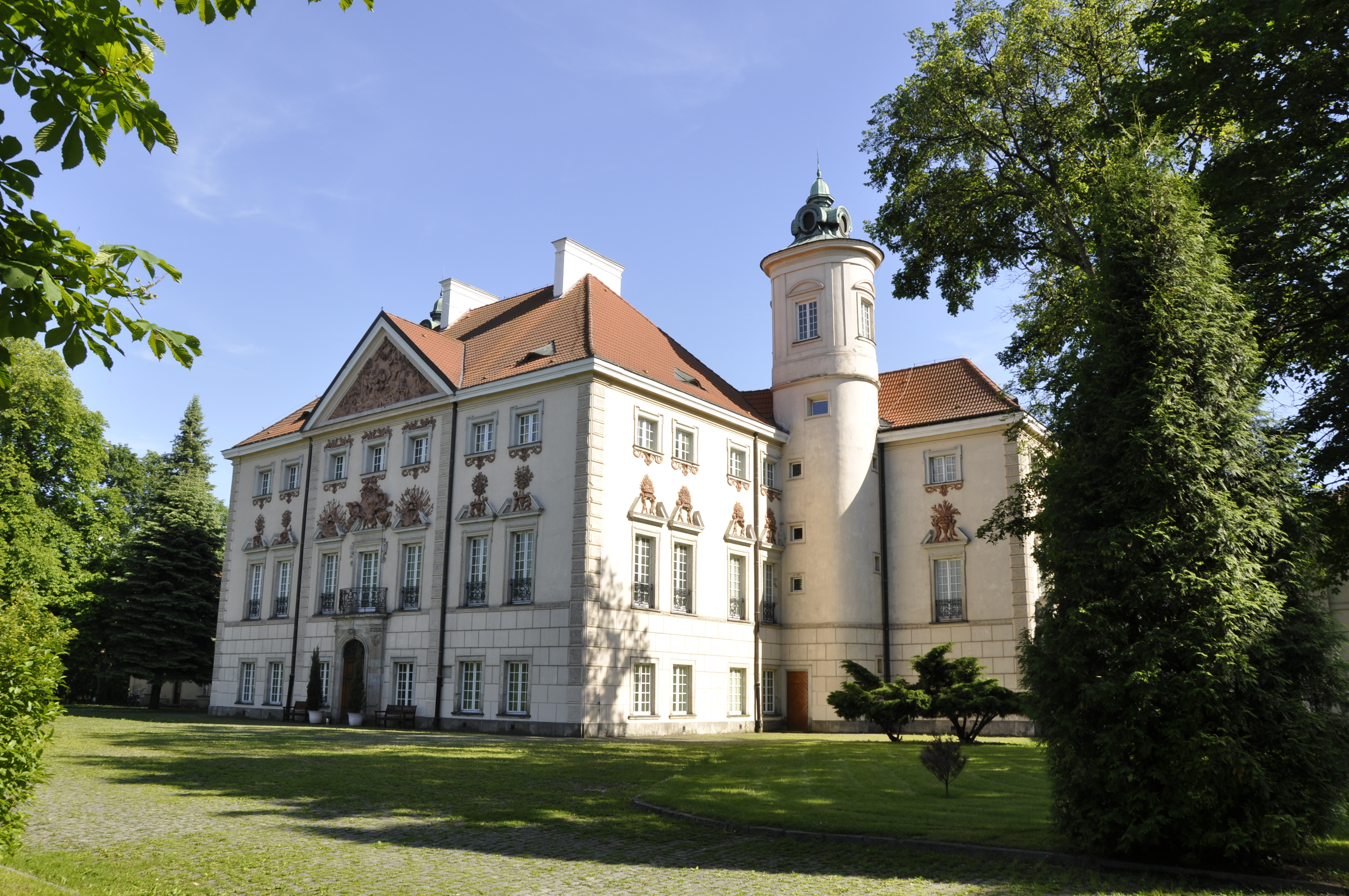
The palace and park in Otwock Wielki

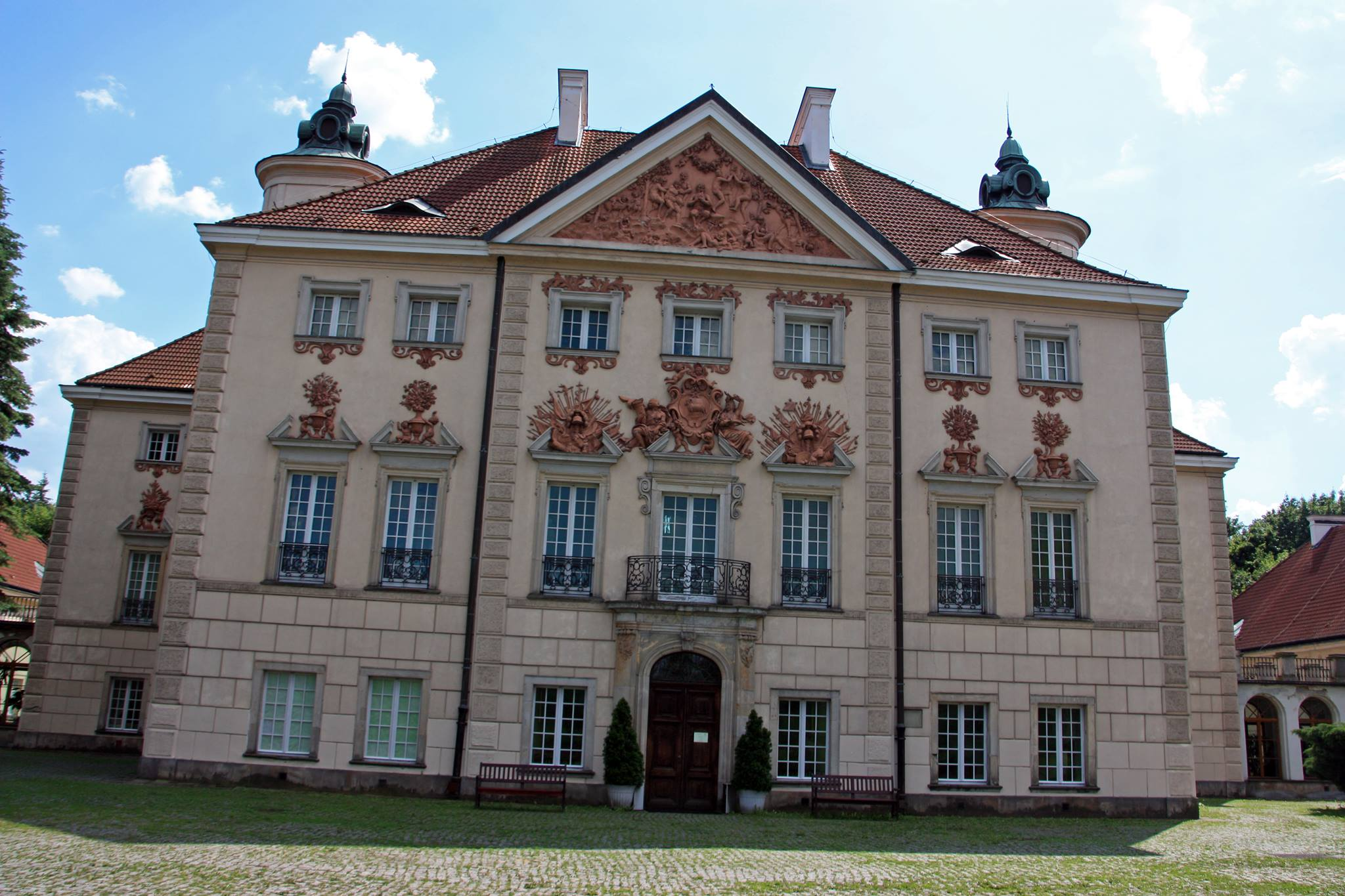
The palace façade

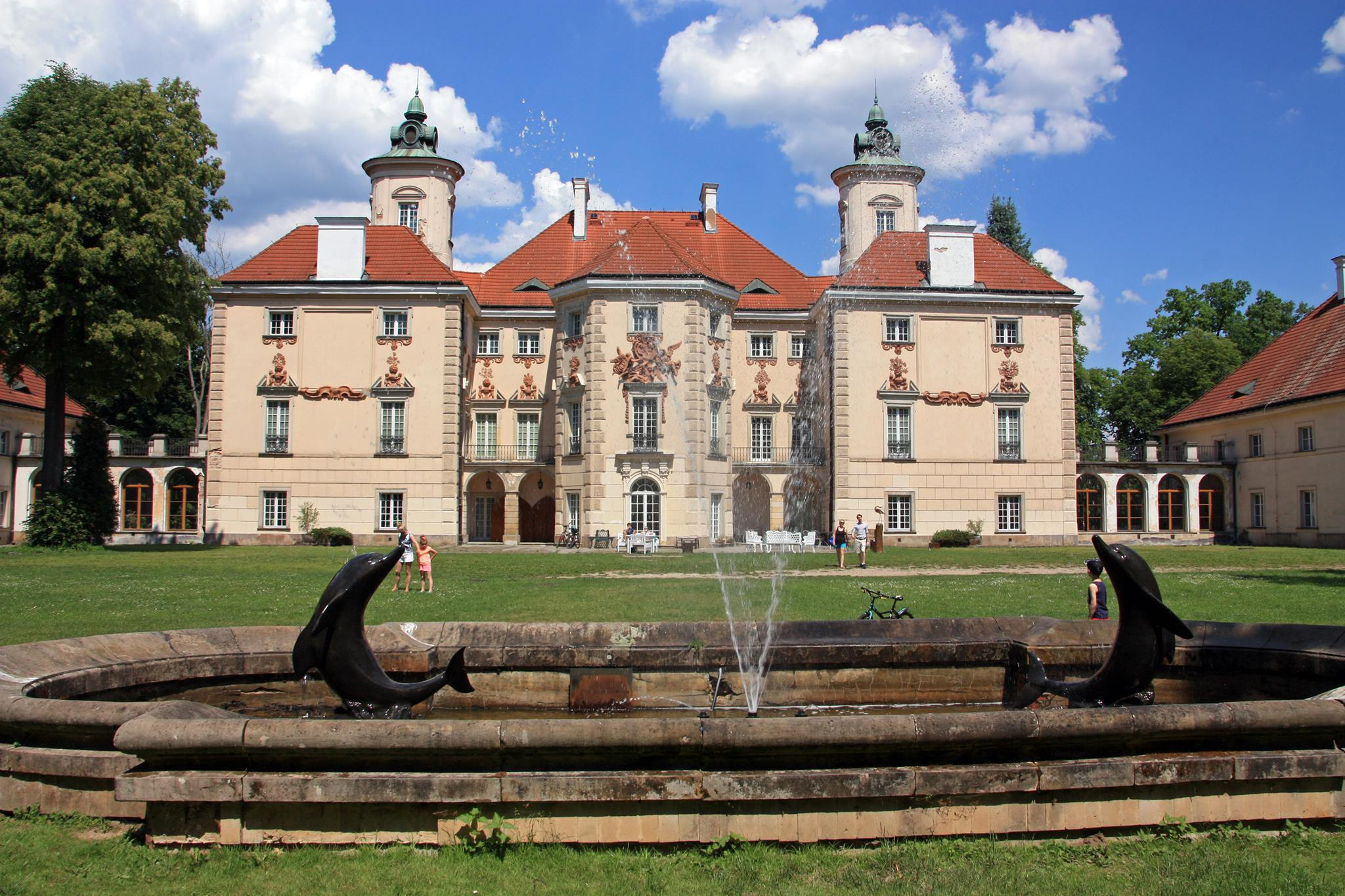
A fountain in the palace gardens

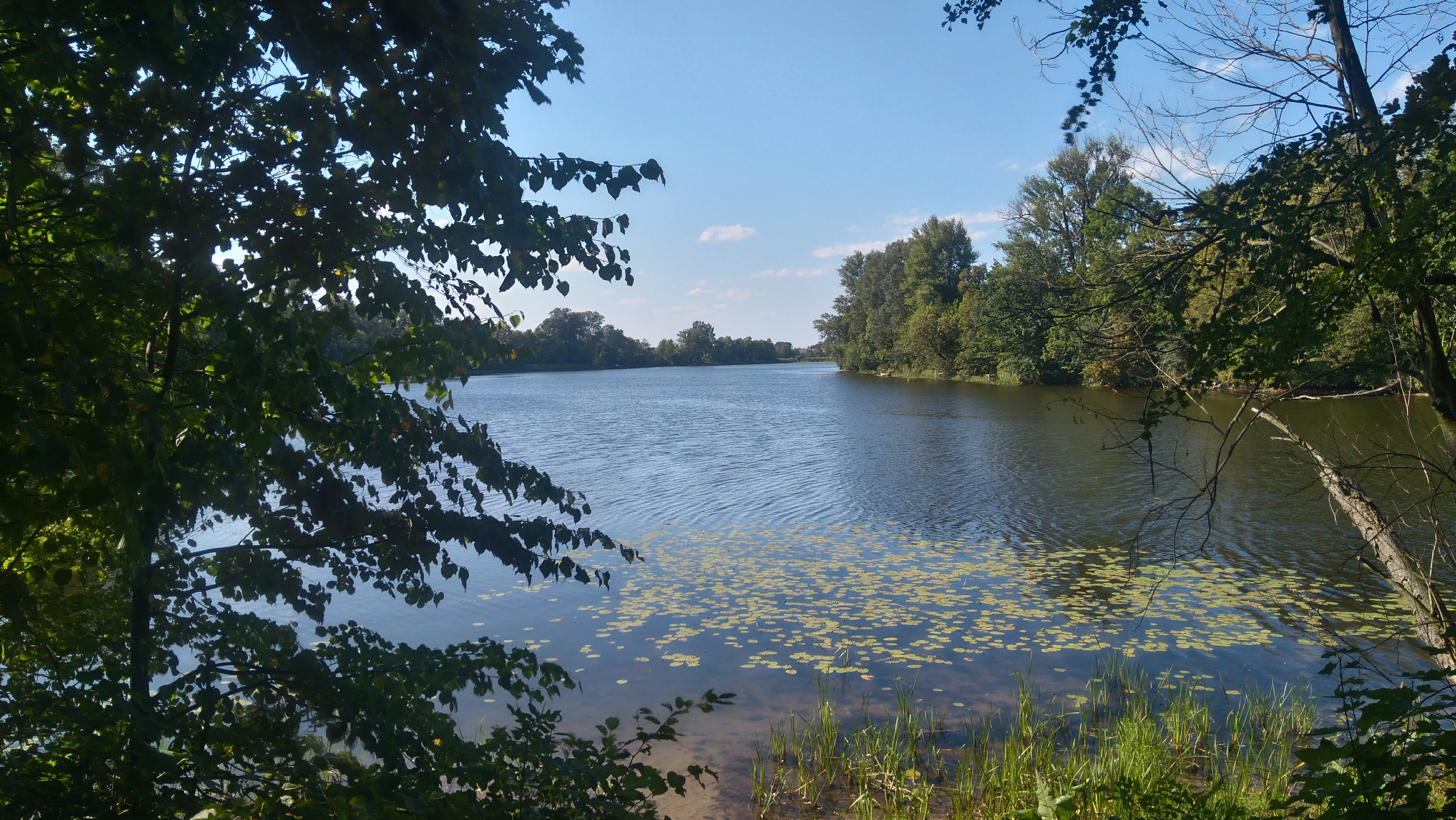
Lake Rokola near the palace
