= Franciszek Bieliński =

Polish statesman

- Grand Marshal of the Crown
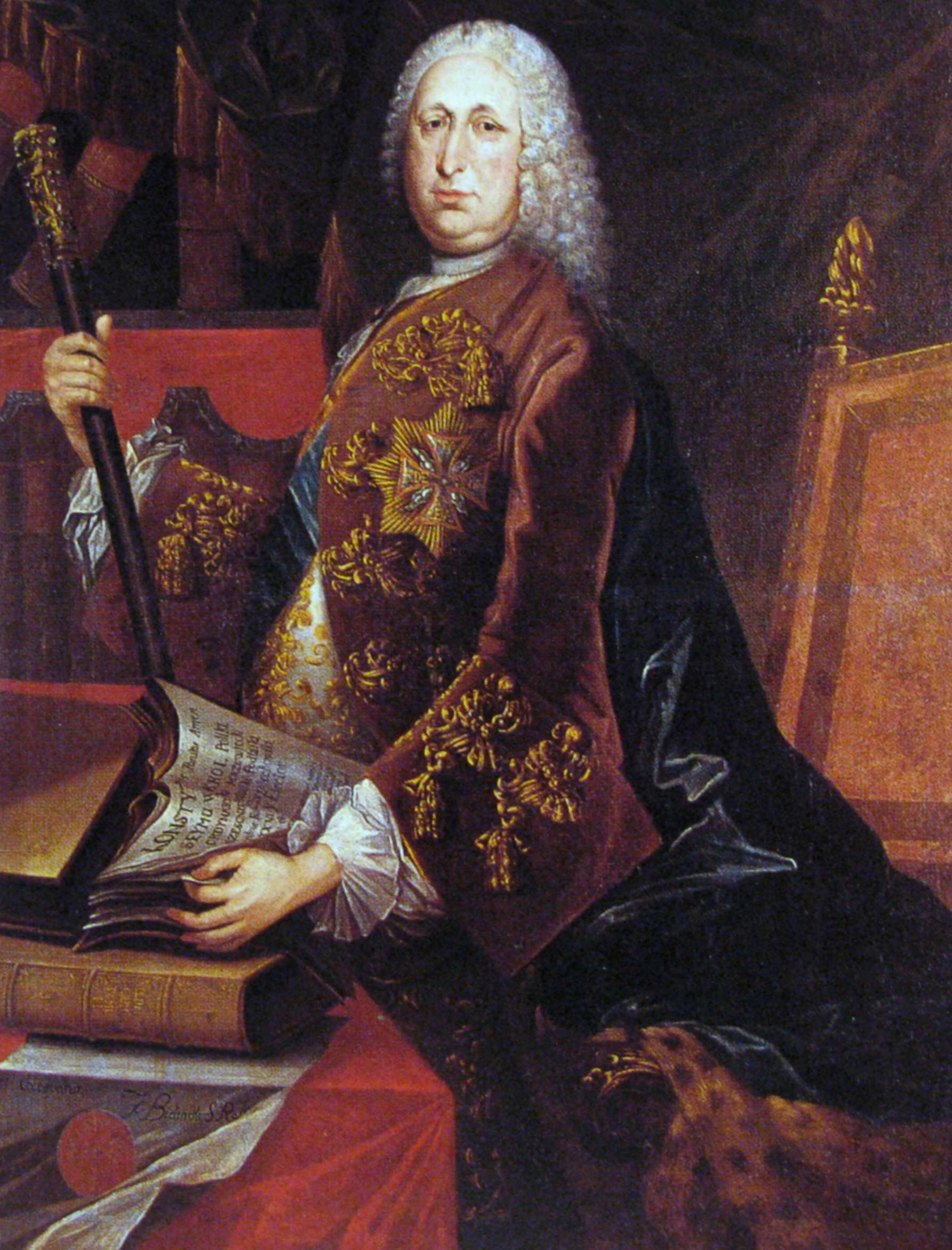
- Coat of arms: Junosza
- Born: 1683
- Died: 8 October 1766 (aged 82–83); Warsaw, Polish–Lithuanian Commonwealth
- Noble family: Bieliński family
- Spouse: Dorota Przebendowska
- Father: Kazimierz Ludwik Bieliński
- Mother: Ludwika Maria Morsztyn

Franciszek Bieliński of Junosza coat of arms (1683–1766) was a Polish statesman. A Crown Grand Marshal, Marshal of Prussia and a voivode of Chełmno, he is best remembered as a strong proponent of the expansion and the modernisation of the city of Warsaw. He is also the eponym of Marszałkowska Street (Marshal Street) in Warsaw, one of the major and most iconic streets of Poland's capital.

== Biography ==
=== Early life ===
He was born in 1683 to Grand Marshal of the Crown Kazimierz Ludwik Bieliński and Ludwika Maria Bielińska, daughter of Grand Treasurer of the Crown. While officially a high-ranking military officer, for most of his life Bieliński had been in fact a skilled civilian administrator. Initially a starost of Malbork, Czersk, Grójec and Garwolin (since 1713), with time he allied himself to the mighty Czartoryski family. This allowed him to move to the royal court and start his career there.

==== Siblings ====
Two of his siblings came to prominence: Maria Magdalena Bielińska, div. Gräfin von Dönhoff, who was King Augustus II the Strong's Maîtresse-en-titre and later married Jerzy Ignacy Lubomirski, and Katarzyna Bielińska (1684–1761), who married Jean Victor, Baron de Besenval, on 18 September 1716, a Swiss noble in French service, who was the French ambassador to Poland at the time. Katarzyna, Baronne de Besenval, née Bielińska, was an influential personality at the royal court of France, thanks to her friendship with Marie Leszczyńska, the Queen of France. Their son was Pierre Victor, Baron de Besenval de Brunstatt, a Swiss military officer in French service, whose Parisian residence was the Hôtel de Besenval.

=== Political career ===
In his role as a Marshal of the Court (since 1732) and then Grand Marshal of Poland during the reign of Augustus II the Strong, Bieliński had in fact administrative and judiciary control over a large part of Prussia (as Grand Treasurer of Prussia), Masovia (as cześnik of the Crown) and the city of Warsaw. In 1740 he created the Warsaw-based Cobblestone Commission, tasked with paving the streets and creating a modern sewer system. Under his leadership in 20 years the commission managed to pave 222 streets, a large majority of streets of the contemporary Polish capital.

In 1752, he permitted the creation of the first professional fire brigade in Poland (based in Ostrów Wielkopolski). In 1757 with his personal funds he created a jurydyka of Bielino, a small village that over time became the core of what is now the city centre of Warsaw. During his civil service he also served as a starost of Kowalewo, Brodnica and Garwolin.

=== Marriage and death ===
He married Dorota Henrietta née Przebendowska, daughter of his father's successor as Grand Treasurer and widow of Jan Mikołaj Radziwiłł, the Voivode of Nowogródek. He died heir-less on 8 October 1766 in Warsaw. In 1770 the Marszałkowska Street was named in his honour and bears that name to this day.

== Bibliography ==
- Helena Waniczkówna: Bieliński Franciszek h. Junosza. W: Polski Słownik Biograficzny. T. 2: Beyzym Jan – Brownsford Marja. Kraków: Polska Akademia Umiejętności – Skład Główny w Księgarniach Gebethnera i Wolffa, 1936, s. 47–50.
