= Kazimierz Ludwik Bieliński =

Polish noble, politician and diplomat

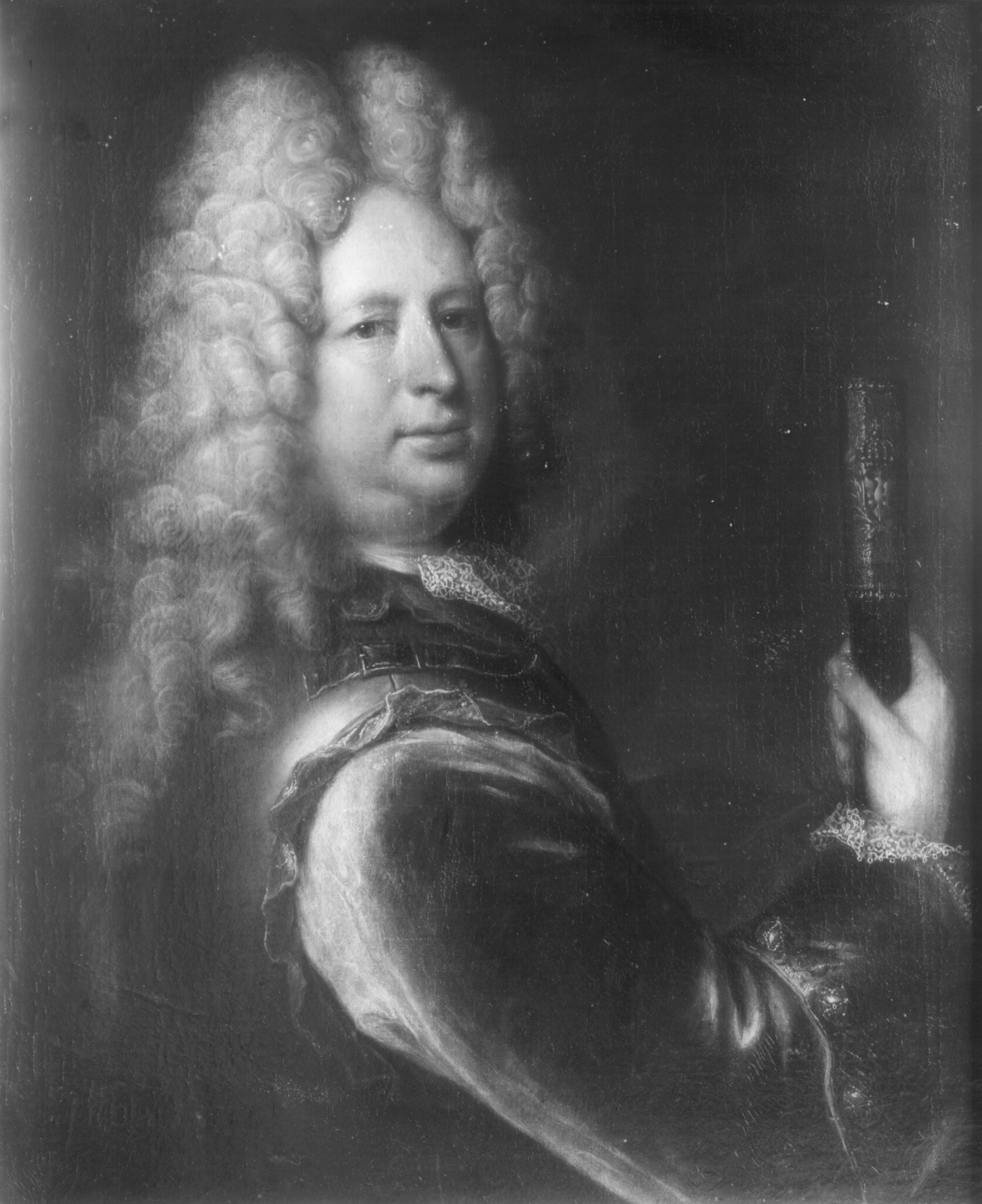
Kazimierz Ludwik Bieliński

Kazimierz Ludwik Bieliński (1663) was a Polish noble, politician and diplomat. He held several prominent offices in the Polish–Lithuanian Commonwealth.

== Early life ==
Bieliński was a son of Jan Franciszek Bieliński.

== Career ==
He was the starost of several counties. He obtained the central office of Crown Court Chamberlain from 1688 to 1702. Court Crown Marshal in 1702 and soon afterward he became the Grand Crown Marshal (1702-1713). He was a deputy to numerous Sejms (1683, 1688, 1690, marshal of the Sejm in 1697). He had a large court at the Palace in Otwock Wielki. He was a member of the Sandomierz Confederation.

Bieliński was the recipient of the Order of the White Eagle.

== Personal life ==
In 1682, he married Ludwika Maria Morsztyn, a daughter of Jan Andrzej Morsztyn. Together, they were the parents of:

- Franciszek Bieliński (b. 1683)
- Marianna Denhoff (1685-1730), the former Maîtresse-en-titre of King Augustus II the Strong; she married Count Bogislaus Ernestus von Dönhoff. After obtaining papal permission from Clement XI to divorce Count Dönhoff, she married Prince Jerzy Ignacy Lubomirski.
- Katarzyna Bielińska (1684–1761), who married Jean Victor, Baron de Besenval de Brunstatt, a Swiss noble in French service, who was the French ambassador to Poland at the time in 1716.

=== Descendants ===
Through his daughter Katarzyna, he was a grandfather of Pierre Victor, Baron de Besenval de Brunstatt, a courtier and military officer in French service, resided in the Hôtel de Besenval. The baron's former Parisian residence has housed the Embassy of the Swiss Confederation since 1938.
