= Jezierski =

Jezierski (feminine Jezierska) is a Polish surname. Notable people with the surname include:

- Adam Jezierski (born 1990), Spanish-Polish actor
- Andrzej Jezierski (born 1980), Polish canoer
- Franciszek Salezy Jezierski (1740–1791), Polish writer
- Ivona Jezierska (born 1958), Polish-American chess-player
- Jacek Jezierski (1722–1805), Polish writer
- Leszek Jezierski (1929–2008), Polish footballer
- Stefan de Leval Jezierski (born 1954), American hornist in the Berlin Philharmonic
