= Erdmuta Zofia von Dieskau =

Polish aristocrat

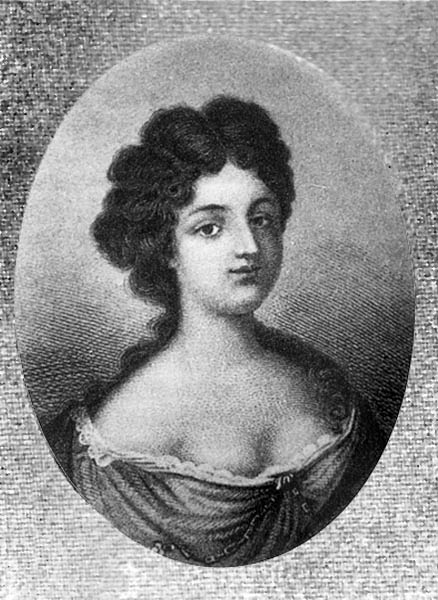
Erdmuthe Sophie von Dieskau

Erdmuta Zofia von Dieskau (1698-1767), was a Polish aristocrat. She replaced Marianna Denhoff as the mistress of Augustus II the Strong in 1719 and was replaced by Henrietta von Osterhausen in 1720.
