= Street Commission =

Cobblestone Commission (Polish: Komisja Brukowa, often rendered in English as Street Commission) was a collegial body tasked with paving the streets of the city of Warsaw. It also financed expansion of city's infrastructure and creation of modern sewer system. It was formed in 1685, but it was not until 1740 that it actually started to function. The Polish parliament disbanded it in 1791 and passed its duties to the newly created Commission of Police and Good Order. The commission was one of the first bodies functioning in all parts of Warsaw, both the royal towns of Warsaw Old Town, Warsaw New Town, Praga and the jurydyka-type settlements, normally exempted from the city's laws.

The commission, officially styled the Cobblestone Commission of His Majesty the King and the Republic was initially created in 1685. At that time most of the city streets were unpaved and muddy. The city's infrastructure and sewers were also in a tragic condition. Headed by the Grand Marshal of the Court, the commission was tasked with paving the streets, creating sewers and wells, draining the swampy areas of Powiśle, building bridges and organising the daily functioning of municipal services. Its services were financed by both the state treasury and the burghers taxed with the so-called Cobblestone Tax, depending on the width of their building's façade (measured in Polish ells of ca. 79 centimetres).

Until 1693 the Commission existed mostly on paper. After that it hired a renowned architect Tylman van Gameren to build numerous municipal buildings. However, its main task remained unfulfilled. Despite initial successes, soon after its creation the Commission practically ceased to exist. It was not until 1740 that it was reformed by Franciszek Bieliński. Under his leadership in less than 20 years it managed to pave 222 roads, the vast majority of streets in Warsaw at the time. The commission also created infrastructure for city's expansion in late 18th and early 19th centuries. It created permanent market squares to empty the city streets of stalls, meliorated numerous swampy areas, and closed all breweries, pottery manufactures and distilleries functioning within densely built-up areas to limit the risk of fires. In 1768 the commission also hired five "Night Wardens", the predecessor of what later became the Warsaw Fire Brigade. The commission also issued numerous decrees, some of them later incorporated into modern Polish law. Among such decrees was a ban on dumping trash on the streets.
