= Belinsky (surname) =

Belinski or Belinsky (feminine: Belinskaya) is a Russian-language surname. Its Polish-language counterpart is Bieliński.

Language	Masculine	Feminine
Polish	Bieliński	Bielińska
Belarusian (Romanization)	Бялінскі (Bialinski)	Бялінская (Bialinskaja, Bialinskaya, Bialinskaia)
Russian (Romanization)	Белинский (Belinsky, Belinskiy)	Белинская (Belinskaya, Belinskaia)
Ukrainian (Romanization)	Бєлінський, Белінський, Білінський (Byelinskyi, Belinskyi, Bilinskyi; Byelinskyy, Belinskyy, Bilinskyy)	Бєлінська, Белінська, Білінська (Byelinska, Belinska, Bilinska)

The surname may refer to:

- Bo Belinsky (1936–2001), American baseball player
- Bruno Bjelinski (1909–1992), Croatian composer
- Fabián Bielinsky (1959–2006), Argentine film director
- Viktoria Milvidskaia Belinsky (born 1967), Russian tennis player
- Vissarion Belinsky (1811–1848), Russian literary critic
- Vitali Belinski (Vitaly Belinsky) (born 1989), Belarusian ice hockey player
- Vladimir Belinski (Belinsky) (born 1941), Russian theoretical physicist

Fictional characters

- Nikolai Belinski, a character from the Call of Duty: Black Ops video game
- Tania Belinsky, Soviet neurosurgeon, a Red Guardian in the Marvel Comics universe
