= Otwock Wielki =

- Village
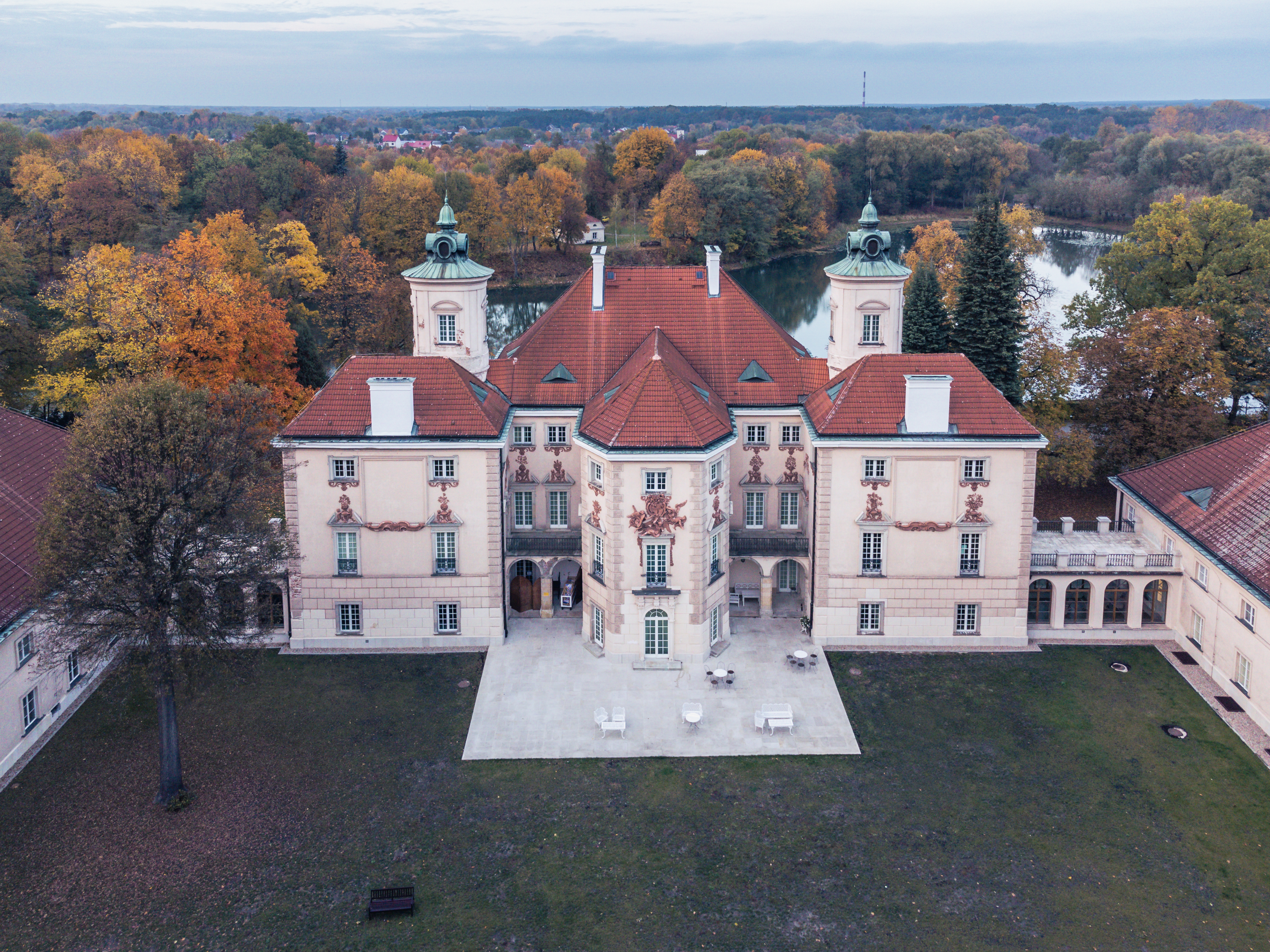
- The palace in Otwock Wielki

- Location within Poland
- Coordinates: 52°2′49″N 21°14′48″E
- Country: Poland
- Voivodeship: Masovian
- County: Otwock
- Gmina: Karczew
- Population: 630

Otwock Wielki (Polish pronunciation: [ˈɔtfɔtsk ˈfjɛlkʲi]) is a village in the administrative district of Gmina Karczew, within Otwock County, Masovian Voivodeship, in east-central Poland.
