= Henrietta von Osterhausen =

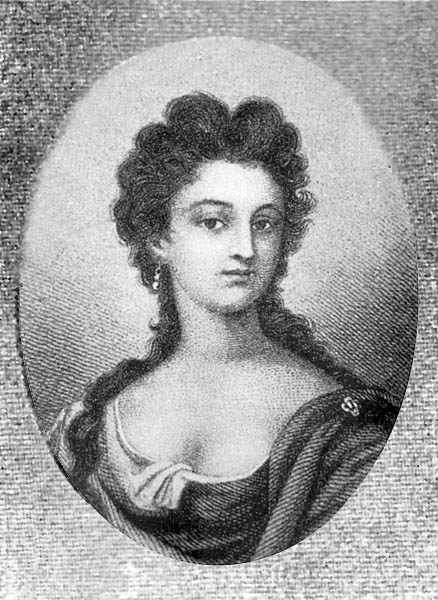
Henriette von Osterhausen

Henrietta von Osterhausen (died 6 November 1727, Dresden), was a German-Polish aristocrat. She is known as the mistress of Augustus II the Strong.

She was a lady-in-waiting to the daughter-in-law of August, Maria Josepha of Austria.

She replaced Erdmuta Zofia von Dieskau as royal mistress in 1720. When the affair was over, Maria Josepha suggested that she become a nun. She did live for the Ursuline convent in Prague, but stayed there only as a guest for a couple of months.

She married Albrecht Zygmunt von Zeigut-Stanisławski on 22 February 1724.
