= Bieliński =

Bieliński (Polish pronunciation: [bjɛˈlɲski]; feminine: Bielińska; plural: Bielińscy) is a Polish-language surname. Its Russified form is Belinsky.

Language	Masculine	Feminine
Polish	Bieliński	Bielińska
Belarusian (Romanization)	Бялінскі (Bialinski)	Бялінская (Bialinskaja, Bialinskaya, Bialinskaia)
Russian (Romanization)	Белинский (Belinsky, Belinskiy)	Белинская (Belinskaya, Belinskaia)
Ukrainian (Romanization)	Бєлінський, Белінський, Білінський (Byelinskyi, Belinskyi, Bilinskyi; Byelinskyy, Belinskyy, Bilinskyy)	Бєлінська, Белінська, Білінська (Byelinska, Belinska, Bilinska)

== People ==
- Daniel Bieliński (fl. 1570s), member of the Polish Brethren
- Franciszek Bieliński (1683–1766), Polish statesman
- Halina Bielińska (1914–1989), Polish director
- Paweł Bieliński, President of Warsaw

== See also ==
- Fabián Bielinsky (1959–2006), Argentine director
