= Jerzy Ignacy Lubomirski =

Polish nobleman (1687–1753)

- Prince
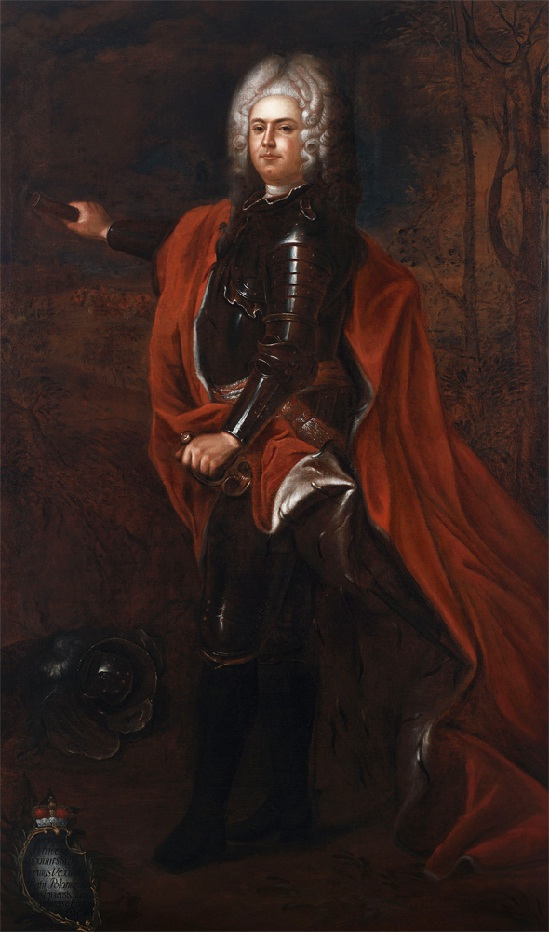

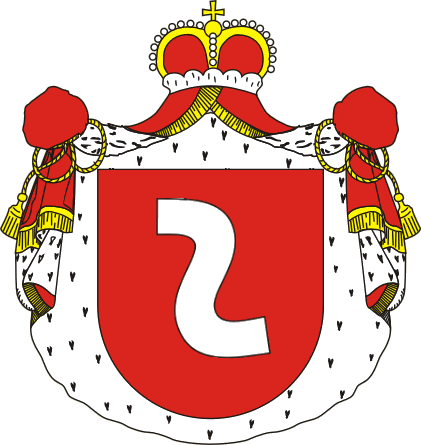
- Coat of arms: Lubomirski
- Born: 15 March 1687
- Died: 19 July 1753 (aged 66)
- Family: Lubomirski
- Consort: Maria Magdalena Bielińska; Joanna von Stein
- Issue: with Maria Magdalena Bielińska: • Teodor Hieronim Lubomirski • Marianna Lubomirska with Joanna von Stein: • Adolf Lubomirski • Jerzy Lubomirski • Franciszek Lubomirski • Józefa Lubomirska • Barbara Lubomirska
- Father: Hieronim Augustyn Lubomirski
- Mother: Konstancja Bokum

Prince Jerzy Ignacy Lubomirski (15 March 1687 – 19 July 1753) was a Polish nobleman (szlachcic).

== Early life ==
Prince Lubomirski was born on 15 March 1687. He was the son of Prince Hieronim Augustyn Lubomirski and Konstancja Bokum. Among his siblings were Princess Anna Lubomirska (wife of Franciszek Wielopolski), Princess Marianna Lubomirska (wife of Krzysztof Towiański), Princess Elżbieta Lubomirska (wife of Jan Rybiński), Prince Jan Lubomirski, and Prince Jakub Lubomirski.

His paternal grandparents were Grand Marshal Prince Jerzy Sebastian Lubomirski and Konstancja Ligęza.

== Career ==
Prince Lubomirski was owner of Rzeszów, Rozwadów and Żelechów estates. He was Field Writer of the Crown from 1726 until 1732, General of the Crown Army, General of Saxon Army, and Colonel of Horse Guards (Gwardia konna) in 1744. Since 1746 Grand Chorąży of the Crown.

He was awarded Knight of the Order of the White Eagle, on 3 August 1727.

== Personal life ==
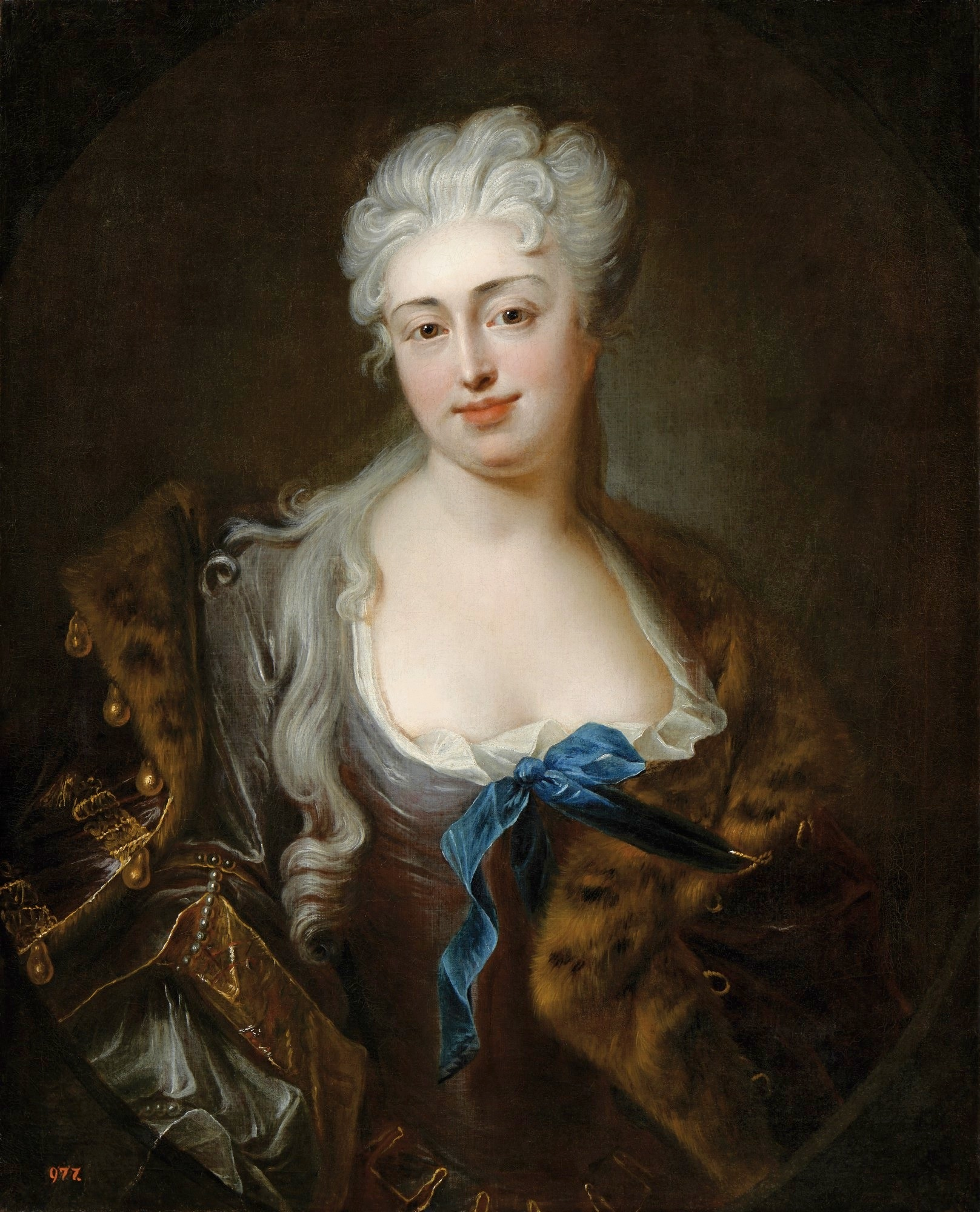
Portrait of his first wife, Marianna

In 1725, Prince Lubomirski married Maria Magdalena Bielińska (1685–1730). The daughter of diplomat Kazimierz Ludwik Bieliński, and Ludwika Maria Morsztyn (a daughter of Jan Andrzej Morsztyn), Marianna had obtained papal permission from Clement XI to divorce her first husband, Count Bogislaus Ernestus von Dönhoff. She was also the former Maîtresse-en-titre of King Augustus II the Strong. Before her death from a postpartum infection on 20 April 1730, they were the parents of:

- Prince Teodor Hieronim Lubomirski
- Princess Marianna Lubomirska

He remarried to Joanna von Stein. Together, they were the parents of:

- Prince Adolf Lubomirski
- Prince Jerzy Lubomirski
- Prince Franciszek Lubomirski
- Princess Józefa Lubomirska
- Princess Barbara Lubomirska, who married Prince Kasper Lubomirski, a Lieutenant general of the Russian Army who was a son of Prince Teodor Lubomirski.

Prince Lubomirski died on 19 July 1753.
