= Jacek Jezierski =

Jacek Jezierski (1722–1805) was a Polish writer and businessman, a member of the Polish nobility and a political writer. From 1775 he was the castellan (governor of the castle) of the town of Łuków. He was also manager of the personal domain of the Primate of Poland, which allowed him to gain a significant fortune. During the Four Years Sejm he opposed the Russian influence in Poland and was among the supporters of a Polish alliance with Prussia and Great Britain. He opposed radical reforms and the granting of civil rights to burghers.
