= Marianna Denhoff =

German-Polish aristocrat

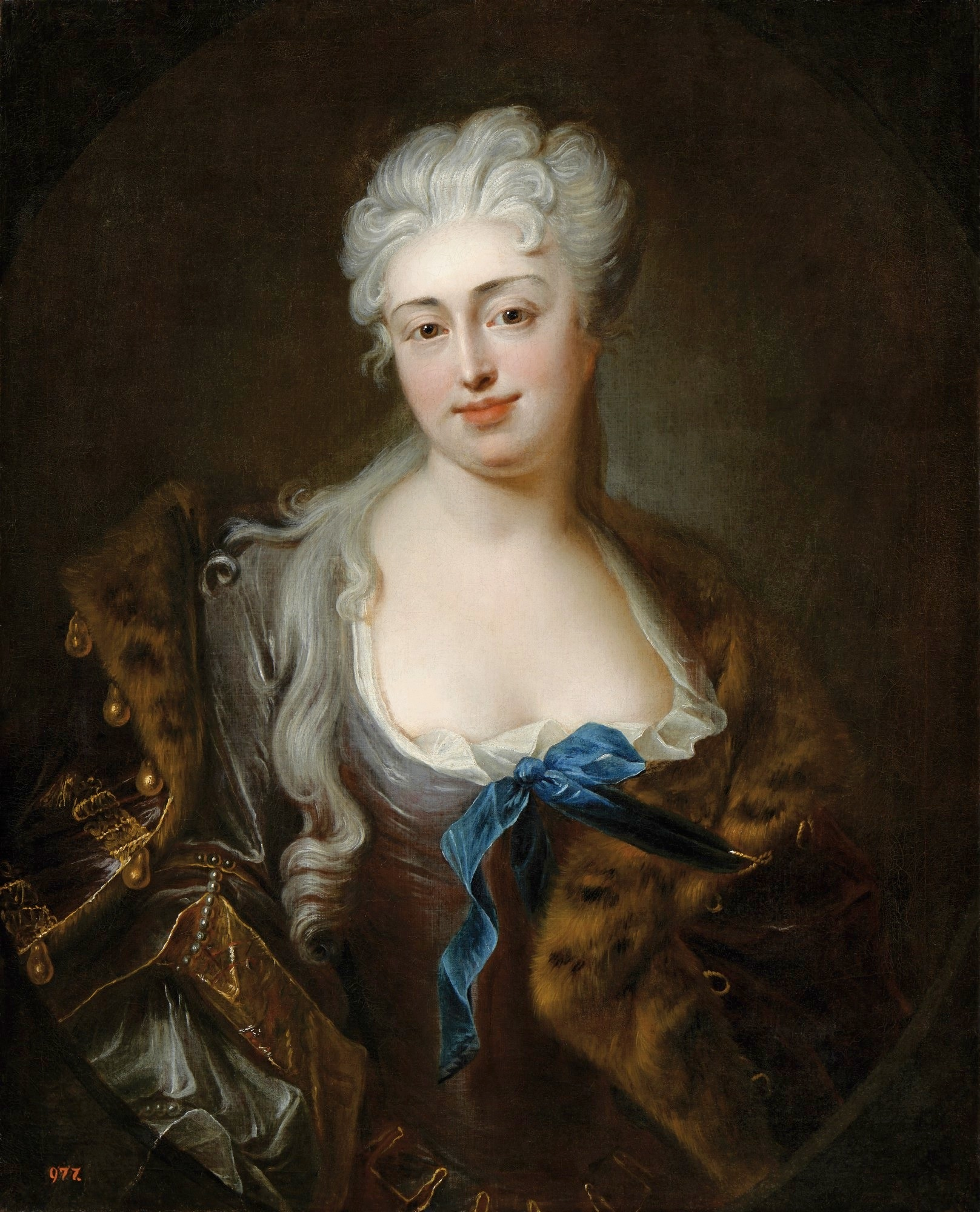
Marianna Denhoff, née Bielińska.

Marianna Denhoff (1685–1730), also Maria Magdalena, Gräfin von Dönhoff, née Bielińska, was a German-Polish aristocrat. She was the daughter of Kazimierz Ludwik Bieliński, a noble, politician, and diplomat and Ludwika Maria Morsztyn, daughter of Jan Andrzej Morsztyn.

== Maîtresse-en-titre ==
Marianna Denhoff was the official royal mistress, the so-called Maîtresse-en-titre, of King Augustus II the Strong. She replaced Anna Constantia von Brockdorff in 1713 and was succeeded by Erdmuta Zofia von Dieskau in 1719.

== Political activist ==
Marianna Denhoff was politically active and cooperated with Jean Victor, Baron de Besenval, the French ambassador in Poland, to persuade the king in favour of a Pro-French policy. Finally, in 1714, she succeeded to convince King Augustus II the Strong to ally with the King of France, Louis XIV. A diplomatic success that was certainly noticed in France and also paid off for the French ambassador.

== Family ==
Marianna Denhoff's first marriage was to Bogislaus Ernestus, Graf von Dönhoff († 24 March 1734), a member of the eastern Prussian line of the Dönhoff family, also known as Denhoff. However, she obtained papal permission from Clement XI to divorce. She remarried to Jerzy Ignacy Lubomirski in 1725. Marianna Denhoff died from a postpartum infection on 20 April 1730.

Ambassador Jean Victor, Baron de Besenval, married Marianna Denhoff's sister Katarzyna Bielińska (1684–1761) on 18 September 1716. A marriage, that was warmly welcomed by Philippe II de Bourbon, Duc d'Orléans, Régent de France (1715–1723). Thus, their son Pierre Victor, Baron de Besenval de Brunstatt, a Swiss military officer in French service, was the nephew of Marianna Denhoff.

Pierre Victor de Besenval's residence in Paris was the Hôtel de Besenval. The residence has housed the Embassy of the Swiss Confederation since 1938.
