= Portrait of Countess Potocka =

Painting by Franz Xaver Winterhalter

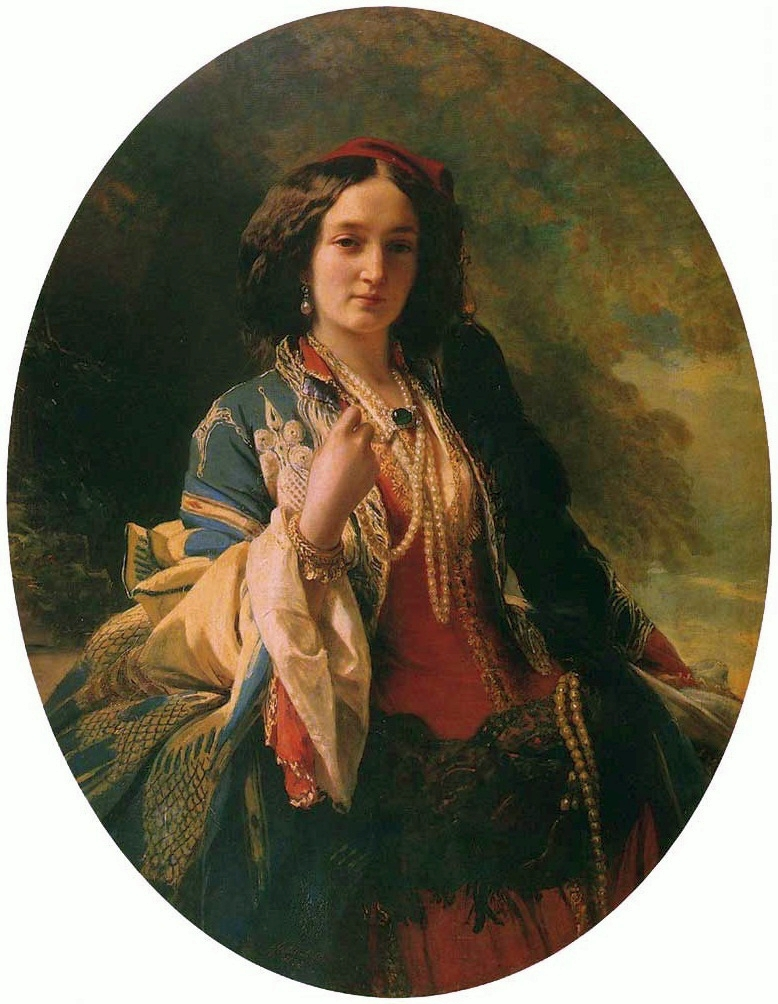
- Artist: Franz Xaver Winterhalter
- Year: 1854
- Medium: Oil on canvas
- Dimensions: 116 cm × 85.5 cm (46 in × 33.7 in)
- Location: National Museum; Warsaw

Portrait of Countess Potocka is an oil on canvas portrait of Katarzyna Potocka née Branicka by German artist Franz Xaver Winterhalter, created in 1854. He was at the time one of the foremost portraitists of Europe's royalty and aristocracy. It is held in the National Museum, in Warsaw.

== History and description ==
Winterhalter was a painter who received many commissions from the various European courts and therefore also from the aristocracy of his time. The pictured, Countess Potocka (1825–1907), belonged to the wealthy nobility of Poland and was a member of the Branicki family. She was born Katarzyna Branicka and in 1847 married Adam Józef Potocki (1822–1872), a member of the Potocki family. The couple had seven children, three of whom were also painted by Winterhalter, including Andrzej Kazimierz, Artur Władysław, Zofia Potocka, and Róża.

The Countess Potocka is depicted here in an oriental costume in a three-quarter size, in the painter's favorite format, an oval. It was commissioned by her sister, Elżbieta Krasińska (1820–1876), who was also painted by Winterhalter. The costume is taken from the exile the couple had spent in the Middle East after Adam Potocki was accused, incorrectly, of an 1848 bombing. Winterhalter follows the examples from the 18th century when such a costume was more common and worn at costume balls.

Winterhalter made at least three portraits of Countess Potocka in the period 1854 to 1858. The whereabouts of the third portrait is unknown and it has presumably been lost. The second is also in Warsaw. A copy of this oriental portrait is in the possession of the French Château Montrésor.

== Provenance ==
The portrait belonged to the Potocki family and hung in Krzeszowice's Potocki Palace . In 1946 it was acquired by the Warsaw National Museum.
