= Branicki =

Branicki may refer to:

- Two aristocratic families of Poland (plural family name: Braniccy)
  - Branicki family (Gryf)
  - Branicki family (Korczak)
- Individuals bearing Branicki surname
  - Franciszek Ksawery Branicki
  - Jan Klemens Branicki
  - Władysław Grzegorz Branicki
  - Jennah Karthes de Branicka
- Places
  - Branicki Palace, Białystok
  - Branicki's Palace, Warsaw
