= Władysław Grzegorz Branicki =

Polish noble (1783–1843)

- Count
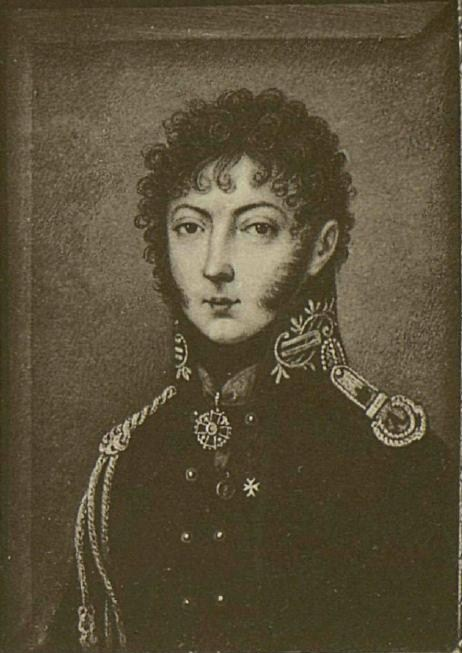

- Coat of arms: Korczak
- Born: 25 February 1783; Warsaw
- Died: 1843 (aged 59–60); Warsaw
- Buried: Biała Cerkiew
- Noble family: Branicki
- Consort: Countess Róża Potocka
- Father: Count Franciszek Ksawery Branicki
- Mother: Aleksandra von Engelbrandt

Count Władysław Grzegorz Branicki (25 February 1783 in Warsaw – 27 August 1843 in Warsaw) was a Polish nobleman, senator and general in the Russian military. He was a putative grandson of Catherine the Great, through his maternal line.

He was owner of the immense Biała Cerkiew estates. After an army career where he was much decorated, he became a senator and political adviser in Russia.

== Marriage and issue ==
In 1813 Władysław Grzegorz married Countess Róża Potocka, officially the daughter of Stanisław Szczęsny Potocki and the artist, Józefina Amalia Mniszech. They had seven children:

- Franciszek Ksawery Branicki (1816–1879), married to Countess Pelagia Zamoyska Rembielińska
- Eliza Branicka (1820–1876), married first, Count Zygmunt Krasiński then his brother, Ludwik Krasiński
- Aleksander Branicki (1821–1877), married Anna Ninna Hołyńska Klamry coat of arms
- Zofia Katarzyna Branicka (1821 or 1824–1886), married Prince Livio Erba-Odescalchi (1805–1885)
- Konstanty Grzegorz Branicki (1824–1884), married Countess Jadwiga Potocka
- Katarzyna Branicka (1825–1907), married Count Adam Józef Potocki
- Władysław Michał Branicki (1826–1884), inherited Biała Cerkiew (due to his eldest brother's forced exile), married Princess Maria Aniela Sapieha

== Honours and awards ==
- Order of the White Eagle
- Order of St. Anna, 1st class
- Order of St. Vladimir, 3rd class
- Order of Saint George, 4th class
- Order of St. John of Jerusalem (Russia)
- Pour le Mérite (Prussia)
- Order of the Red Eagle (Prussia)
- Kulm Cross
- Gold Sword for Bravery
- Order of Leopold (Austria)
- Military Order of Max Joseph (Bavaria)
- Iron Cross of 1813 (Prussia)
- Order of Military Merit, (Württemberg)
- Order of Military Merit (France)

== Bibliography ==
- Polski Słownik Biograficzny t. 2 s. 412
- Marek Ruszczyc, Dzieje rodu i fortuny Branickich, Warszawa 1991
