= Róża Potocka =

Polish noblewoman (1849–1937)

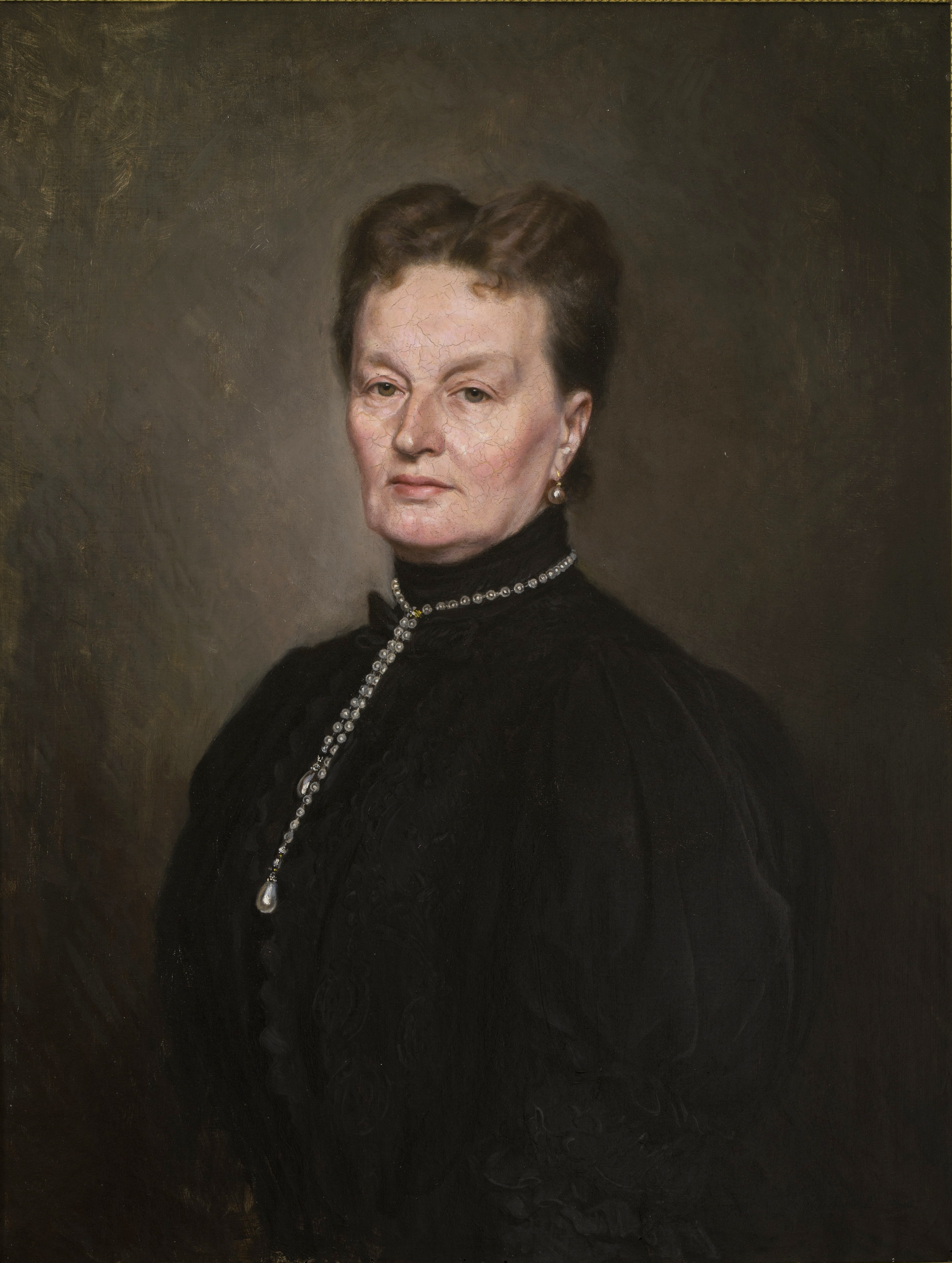
- 1906 portrait
- Coat of arms: Piława
- Born: 7 January 1849; Kraków
- Died: 21 August 1937 (aged 88); Powiat poznański
- Buried: Rogalin
- Noble family: Potocki
- Spouses: Władysław Krasiński; Edward Aleksander Raczyński
- Father: Adam Józef Potocki
- Mother: Katarzyna Branicka

Countess Róża Potocka (1849–1937) was a Polish noblewoman, landowner and by birth member of the illustrious House of Potocki.

== Early life ==
Róża was born in Kraków as the eldest child and the eldest daughter of Count Adam Józef Potocki and Countess Katarzyna Branicka.

== Biography ==
Róża was married twice, first to Count Władysław Krasiński (1844–1873) since 20 June 1868 (Krzeszowice) and then to Count Edward Aleksander Raczyński, since 2 October 1886 (Zakopane).

She had three children with Krasiński:

- Count Adam Krasiński (1870-1909), married to Countess Wanda Maria Emilia Badeni (1874-1950)
- Countess Elżbieta Maria Krasińska (1871-1906), married to Count Jan Tyszkiewicz (1861-1903)
- Countess Zofia Krasińska (1873-1891), unmarried

She also had two children with Raczyński:

- Count Roger Adam Raczyński (1889-1945), married to Helena Rohozińska (1892-1966)
- Count Edward Bernard Raczyński (1891-1993), married firstly to Joyous Markham (1902-1931), married secondly to Cecylia Maria Jaroszyńska z Jaroszynki (1906-1962), married thirdly to Aniela Maria Lilpop (1910-1998)

== Death ==
Countess Róża died 21 Aug 1937 in Powiat poznański, aged 88.

== Sources ==
- Andrzej Władysław Korusiewicz: Panowie na Krzeszowicach p. 135. wyd. Towarzystwo Słowaków w Polsce; ISBN 83-7490-014-8.
- „Sławne Polki”, wyd. PODSIEDLIK-RANIOWSKI I SPÓŁKA.
