= Portrait of Zofia Potocka =

Painting by Franz Xaver Winterhalter

Portrait of Countess Zofia Potocka
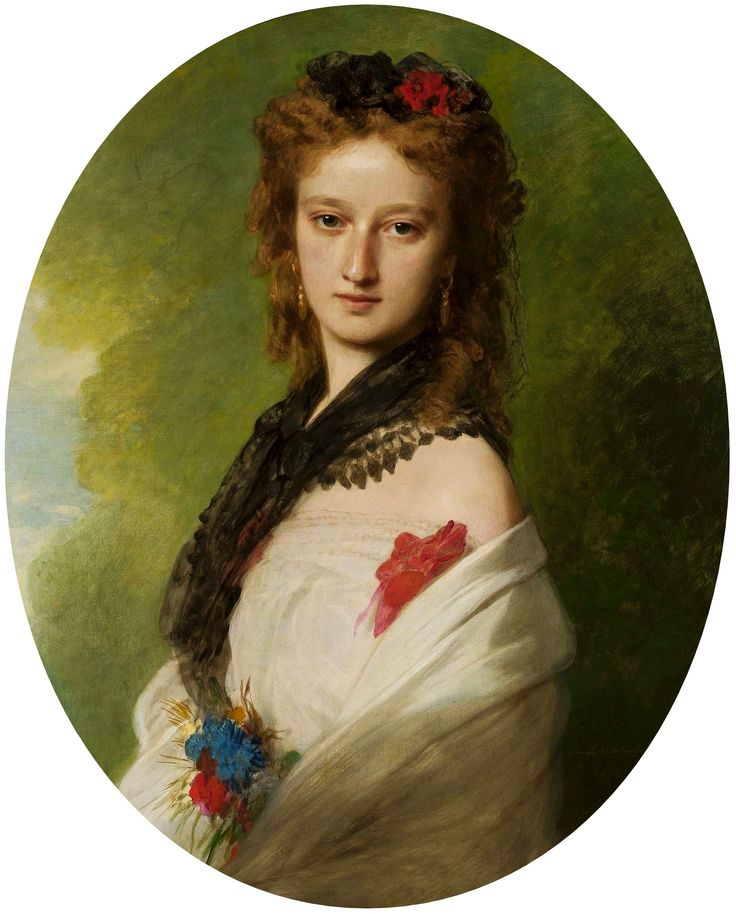
- Artist: Franz Xaver Winterhalter
- Year: 1870
- Medium: Oil on canvas
- Dimensions: 82 cm × 65 cm (32 in × 26 in)
- Location: National Museum; Warsaw

Portrait of Zofia Potocka is an oil on canvas painting by German artist Franz Xaver Winterhalter, created in 1870. It is located in the National Museum, in Warsaw.

== History and description ==
Winterhalter was a leading painter of the European royalty and aristocracy in the 19th century. He received many commissions from the various European courts and therefore also from the aristocracy of his time. The depicted, Countess Zofia Potocka (1851-1927), belonged to the wealthy nobility of Poland and was a member of the Potocki family. She was a daughter of Count Adam Józef Potocki (1815-1872) and Countess Katarzyna Branicka (1825-1907), and thus a granddaughter of Count Artur Stanisław Potocki, Lord of Krzeszowice (1787-1832), captain and adjutant to French Emperor Napoleon I. She married Count Stefan Zamoyski (1837-1899), a member of the Austrian House of Lords and of the Zamoyski family, in 1870; the couple had six children.

Her mother (Portrait of Countess Potocka), her sister (Portrait of Roza Potocka) and her brother Artur were also painted by Winterhalter, the three children when he visited Warsaw in 1856. This is the second portrait of her, from 1870, also painted on an oval. The portrait from 1856 is also in the National Museum, in Warsaw.

Zofia is depicted with a green background, suggesting the nature, and is dressed according with her social status, in a fine white dress, showing her shoulders, and with a shawl around her neck. Her dress is decorated with some flowers, which she also wears in her head. She appears slightly turned to her left, looking directly to the viewer, with a calm, dignified appearance.
