= Andrzej Kazimierz Potocki =

Austro-Hungarian Polish aristocrat and politician (1861–1908)

Count Andrzej Kazimierz Potocki
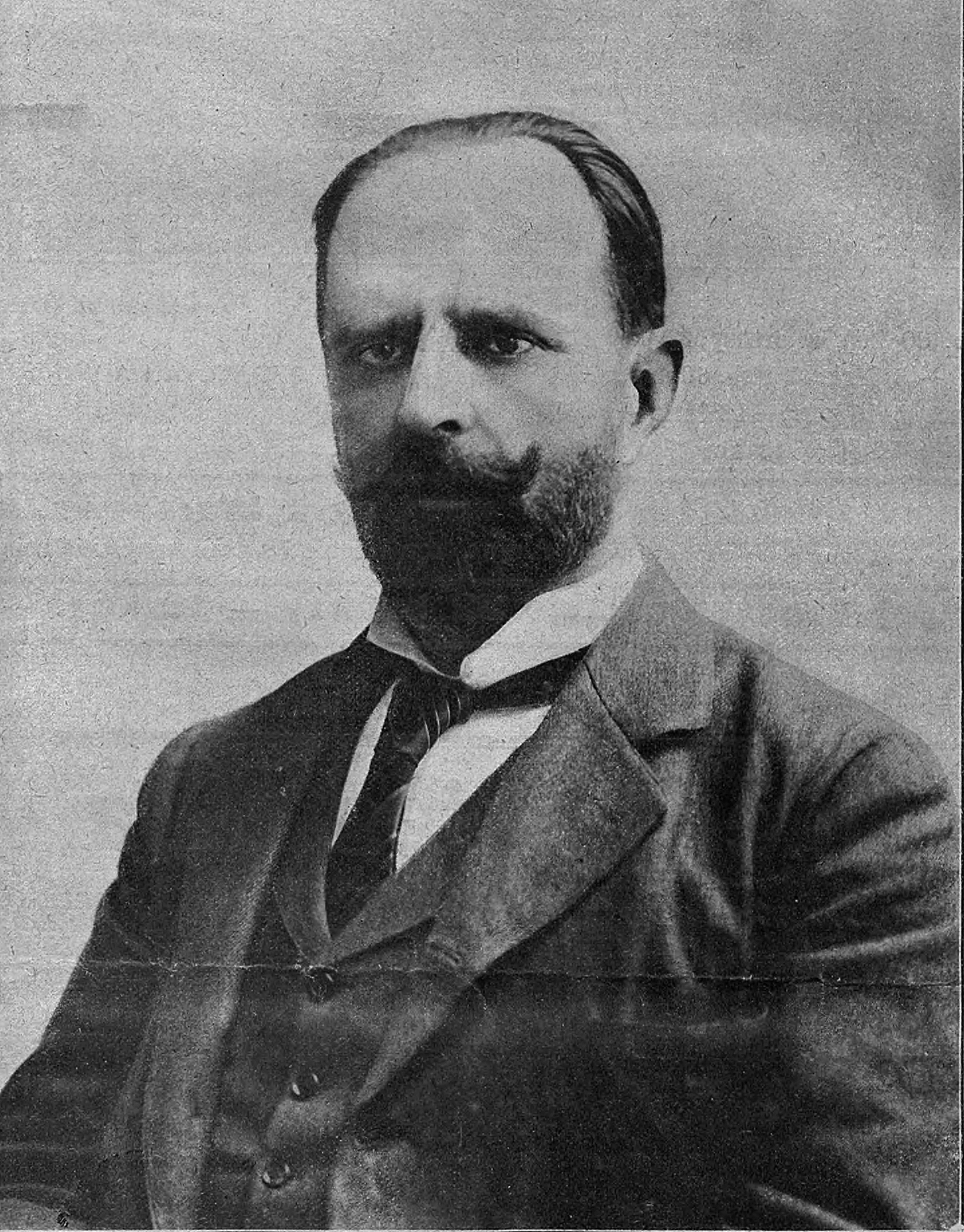

Governor of Galicia and Lodomeria
- In office June 1903 – 12 April 1908
- Monarch: Franz Joseph I
- Preceded by: Leon Piniński
- Succeeded by: Michał Bobrzyński

Personal details
- Born: 10 June 1861 Krzeszowice, Austria (now Poland)
- Died: 12 April 1908 (aged 46) Lemberg, Galicia and Lodomeria, Austria-Hungary (now Lviv, Ukraine)
- Parent: Adam Józef Potocki (father)
- Relatives: Potocki family
- Education: Jagiellonian University

Count Andrzej Kazimierz Potocki (10 June 1861 – 12 April 1908) was a Polish aristocrat and Austro-Hungarian politician who was Governor of the Kingdom of Galicia and Lodomeria from 1903 until his assassination by Ukrainian nationalist Myroslav Sichynskyi in 1908.

== Early life ==
Andrzej Kazimierz Potocki was born on 10 June 1861 in Krzeszowice, the younger son of Adam Potocki, a member of the Potocki family and a politician in the Eastern European region of Galicia, at the time under the control of the Austrian Empire, and his wife, Katarzyna née Branicka.

He was educated at the Saint Anne Gymnasium in Kraków from 1877, passing the matura exam with honours in 1879. He studied at the Jagiellonian University, where he obtained a doctorate in law in 1884.

== Political career ==
=== Early career ===
In 1886, he began working in the Austrian diplomatic service as an attaché at the embassy in Paris, later serving in Madrid and London. In 1890, after the death of his brother Artur, he returned to the country and took over the management of the family estates, also becoming involved in the political life of Galicia. In 1893, he was elected a councilor of Kraków, but lost the mayoral election to Józef Friedlein. He was also active in social life as a member of numerous associations, serving, among others, as president of the Archaeological and Numismatic Society, in which role he became involved in the restoration of Wawel Castle.

On 18 February 1895, he was elected to the Viennese Imperial Council. On 25 September 1895, he was also elected to the Galician Diet from the rural communes’ curia of the Chrzanów district. From September 1901, he became a life member of the House of Lords of the Imperial Council, and from June 1907, a hereditary member. On 9 September 1901, he became the Marshal of the Galician Diet, and on 8 June 1903, the Governor of Galicia. Politically, he was associated with the Stańczyk camp and represented conservative positions of landowners. Unlike his predecessor as governor, Leon Piniński, however, he was not a priori hostile towards peasant and socialist circles, but instead sought dialogue and compromise.

=== Governor of Galicia ===
In July 1904, he brought an end to the strike in the Boryslav oil basin by agreeing to most of the demands, including above all the eight-hour working day. In November 1904, he resolved in a similar manner the strike of medical students at the Jagiellonian University Medical College. He took an opposing stance, however, toward the agrarian strikes in Eastern Galicia, organized mainly in 1903 and 1906 by the Ukrainian peasantry. He believed these strikes to be not so much class-driven as national in character, directed against the Polish landed gentry.

He reacted very sharply to the outbreak of the Russian Revolution of 1905, fearing its spread into Galicia. The Polish Circle in Vienna, in agreement with him, condemned all expressions of solidarity with the revolutionary movement in Congress Poland. He demanded that the Galician police hand over socialist activists in Galicia who came from Congress Poland. He supported dispersing demonstrations by police and the military. He opposed the bilingual petition put forward by socialists Ignacy Daszyński and Mykola Hankevich during the great Lwów demonstration of 23 October 1905, which demanded the introduction of a four-attribute elections and the abolition of electoral curiae. However, pressure from the central authorities, including personally from Emperor Franz Joseph, forced him to make concessions. He drafted a project for the introduction of a “national cadastre,” which would have ensured Polish dominance in mandates over the Ukrainians. Ultimately, however, the project of Michał Bobrzyński prevailed, as it offered greater, though still limited, opportunities for Ukrainian and peasant groups to gain representation.

In 1906, Potocki reacted sharply to another agrarian strike in Eastern Galicia, though he did not decide to introduce a state of emergency, as the landowners had expected. However, he did introduce a number of measures to facilitate the hiring of agricultural laborers in the western part of the country, including Hutsuls, who were to replace the strikers. The most active participants were arrested. In preparation for a general strike in July 1906, he ordered the deployment of the army and gendarmerie in the most threatened regions.

=== 1907 and 1908 elections ===
As a result of the reform of the Cisleithanian electoral law, 106 out of a total of 516 seats were allocated to Galicia. Two-member electoral districts were introduced, in which the "majority mandate" required at least 50% of the votes, while the "minority mandate" required more than 25%. Although this system increased the conservatives’ chances of getting their candidates elected, in general the reform of significantly reduced the chances of the conservatives. Not wanting to allow the socialists and Ukrainian nationalists to win too many seats, during the elections of May 1907 Potocki, alongside the conservatives, also supported the National Democrats, and in Eastern Galicia the Ukrainian Russophiles.

In December 1907 he brought about an alliance between the conservative National Right Party and the Polish People’s Party, representing peasantry. In October, an agreement was also reached with the Ukrainian National Democratic Party, which crowned lengthy negotiations. The Ukrainians were to receive several leading posts in the Galician and central administrations, and guarantees were given that national discrimination in personnel policy in Galicia would be abolished. Ukrainian chairs were also to be created at the University of Lviv, along with three new Ukrainian gymnasia and support for Ukrainian cultural institutions. The new electoral law was to secure 35 seats in the Imperial Council for the Ukrainians. In return, the Ukrainians undertook to cooperate in repelling radical political and social agitation.

The terms of this agreement met with opposition within Potocki’s own circle, which ultimately prompted him to once again support the Russophile faction. In the end, the Russophiles achieved a major electoral success, gaining 10 seats, while the Ukrainian nationalists obtained 11. This result inflamed public sentiment in Eastern Galicia. Realizing, it seems, his mistake, Potocki tried to resume negotiations with the Ukrainian National Democrats, through their leader Yevhen Olesnytskyi, offering him the post of deputy marshal of the Galician Diet. The agreement would not come to fruition, as a result of Potocki's assassination and Olesnytskyi's subsequent heart attack.

== Assassination ==
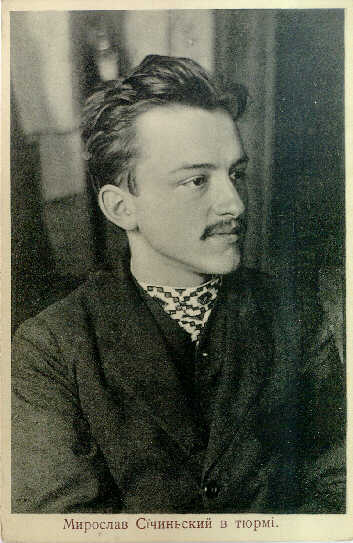
Myroslav Sichynskyi (pictured after his arrest) assassinated Potocki by shooting on 12 April 1908

On 12 April 1908, Potocki held a Sunday reception with citizens at the Government House, the governor's residence in Lviv. Shortly after 13:40, Potocki was shot three times at point-blank range with a revolver by Myroslav Sichynskyi, a student and the youngest member of a prominent family of Greek Catholic priests and politicians. Sichynskyi had previously partaken in a pro-autonomy riot by Ukrainian students at the University of Lviv in 1907, and he had been pardoned after being arrested for involvement in the riots. It was allegedly an act of revenge for the death of the Ukrainian peasant politician Marko Kahanets, who had been killed during election-related unrest.

Potocki lived for another hour after being shot, during which he confessed to Catholic priest Józef Bilczewski. Potocki is said to have uttered among his last words: “Telegraph the emperor that I was his loyal servant.”

A wave of violence by Poles against Ukrainians began following Potocki's assassination, further increasing already-inflamed tensions. The killing also led to an increased interest in militancy as a means to acquire Ukrainian independence from Austria and separation from Polish landowners. Several moderate Ukrainian politicians and public figures condemned the assassination, chiefly among them Metropolitan of the Ukrainian Greek Catholic Church Andrey Sheptytsky.

In addition to political qualms, there was at first speculation that Sichynskyi had been suffering from suicidal urges when he killed Potocki, as his eldest brother had previously committed suicide and Sichynskyi himself was believed to be suicidal. During mental evaluations conducted prior to his trial, however, Austrian police assessed that he was mentally healthy. Sichynskyi would be imprisoned for only a year before being set free by sympathetic prison guards. He emigrated to the United States, where he remained as a minor, pro-Soviet figure in the Ukrainian diaspora community until his death.

== Family and estate ==
Potocki was the heir to a vast fortune, which he multiplied throughout his career. It comprised numerous estates in Galicia, Congress Poland and Ukraine. In Galicia, he owned estates covering 19,000 hectares, including above all Krzeszowice and Kamionka Strumiłłowa, as well as two coal mines, several other mineral mines, an oil refinery in Trzebinia, a brickyard, sawmills, and two distilleries. In Congress Poland, he held the Międzyrzec estate and other properties amounting to 41,000 hectares. In Ukraine, he owned the Burzanka-Wilkowce estate of 27,000 hectares and two sugar factories. He also possessed smaller estates in Hungary and Moravia.

In 1889, he married Krystyna Tyszkiewicz-Łohojska in Trakų Vokė in Lithuania, the daughter of Jan Witold and Iza Adelajda Tyszkiewicz-Łohojski. They had six daughters:

- Katarzyna (1890–1977), wife of Leon Aleksander Sapieha;
- Maria Teresa (b. 1891), wife of Józef Tyszkiewicz;
- Izabela (1893–1962), wife of Franciszek Krasiński;
- Krystyna (1894–1963), wife of Stanisław Siemieński-Lewiński;
- Zofia (1902–1940), wife of Władysław Jezierski;
- Joanna (1904–1967), wife of Stanisław Potocki;

And three sons:

- Adam (1896–1966), husband of Maria Dembińska, owner of Krzeszowice;
- Artur (1899–1941), husband of Maria Tarnowska;
- Andrzej (1900–1939), husband of Zofia Tarnowska, owner of Międzyrzec Podlaski, participant in the September Campaign, killed near Wielkie Oczy.
