= Michał Bobrzyński =

Polish historian and politician (1849–1935)

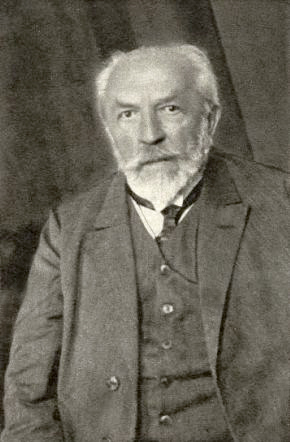

Life Member of the Austrian House of Lords
- In office 4 March 1914 – 1918

Minister of Galicia
- In office 31 October 1916 – 1 June 1917
- Preceded by: Zdzisław Morawski
- Succeeded by: Juliusz Twardowski

Member of the Diet of Galicia and Lodomeria
- In office 1885 – 1914

Governor of Galicia
- In office 1908 – 1913
- Preceded by: Andrzej Kazimierz Potocki
- Succeeded by: Witold Korytowski

Member of the Austrian House of Deputies
- In office 17 November 1903 – 5 May 1908
- In office 22 September 1885 – 24 September 1890

Personal details
- Born: Michał Hieronim Bobrzyński; 30 September 1849 Kraków, Grand Duchy of Kraków, Austrian Empire
- Died: 3 July 1935 (aged 85) Łopuchówko, Poznań Voivodeship, Poland

Michał Hieronim Bobrzyński (Michael Bobrzynski) (30 September 1849 – 3 July 1935) was a Polish historian and conservative politician.

== Life ==
Bobrzynski was born at Kraków in Galicia. He was educated there, graduating from the gymnasium and the Jagiellonian University. In 1872 he received his LL.D. and the following year became assistant professor in the history of Polish jurisprudence, in 1876 assuming similar duties in regard to German law. In 1877 he became professor of law at the Jagiellonian University.

In 1885–91 he was a member of the Reichsrat and held many other honorary and responsible positions, and in 1890–1901 he was president of the Galician board of education. He was Governor of Galicia in 1908–13.

His most important publications are his Geschichte Polens (1879), which aroused much criticism on account of its bitter attacks on Poland's past, and his contributions to Lencl's Polnische Rechtsdenkmäler (1874–82).

== See also ==
- List of Poles
