= Stefan Horodyński =

Member of the Repnin Sejm
- In office 1767–1768
- Constituency: Ruthenian Voivodeship

Scribe of the Castle Court of the Ruthenian Voivodeship
- In office 1767–1767

Swordbearer of the Kiev Voivodeship
- In office 1753–1767

Stefan Horodyński (Polish: [ˈstɛ.fan xɔ.rɔˈdɘ̟ɲ.ski]) was an 18th-century clerk and politician in the Polish–Lithuanian Commonwealth, and a nobleperson from the Korczak heraldic clan. From 1753 to 1767, he was a swordbearer of the Kiev Voivodeship, and in 1767, he was a scribe of the Castle Court of the Ruthenian Voivodeship. From 1767 to 1768, he was a member of parlament, representing the Ruthenian Voivodeship in the Repnin Sejm.
