= Katarzyna Branicka =

Polish noblewoman (1825–1907)

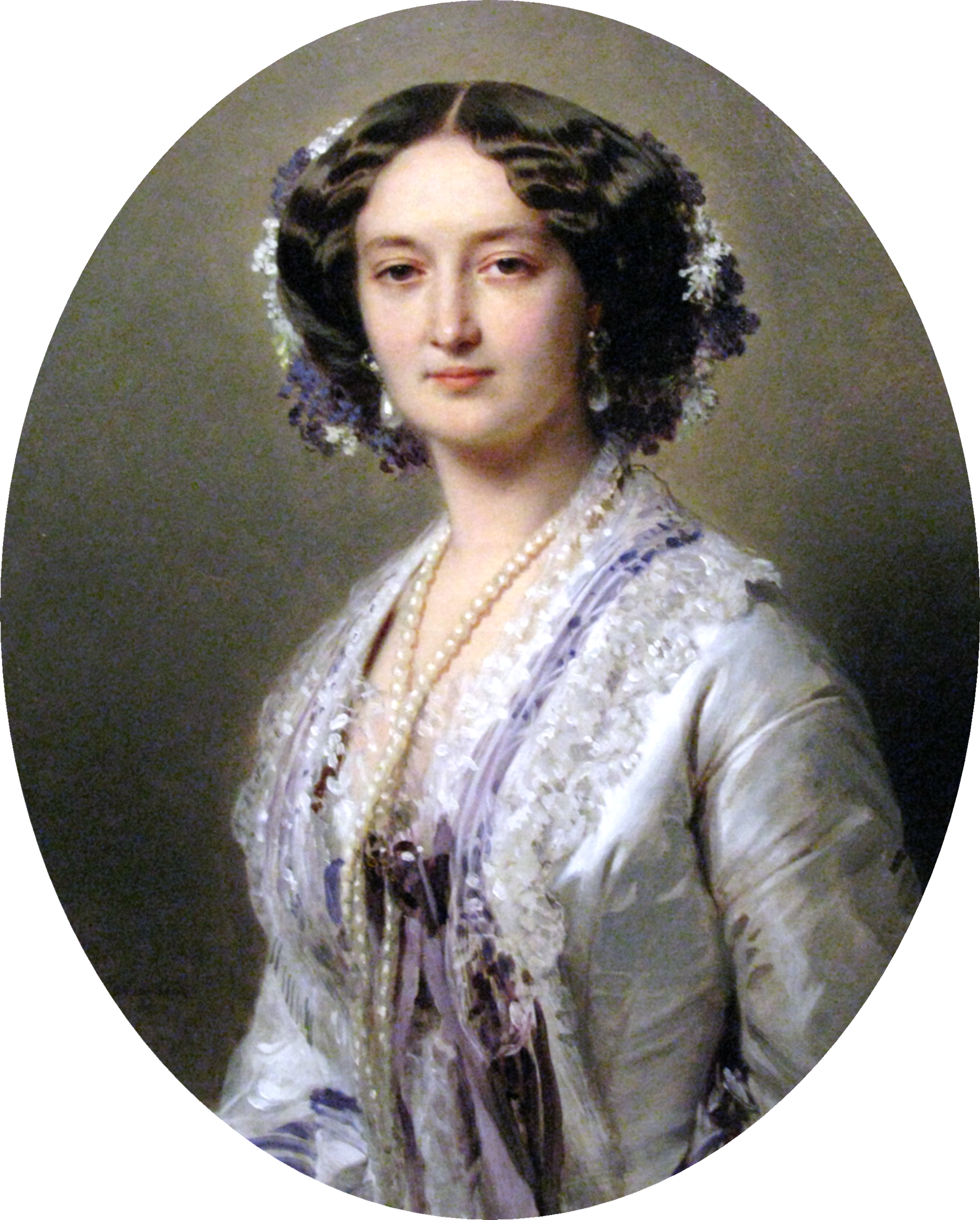
- Portrait by Franz Winterhalter, 1854
- Born: 10 December 1825; Luboml, Volhynian Governorate, Russian Empire (now in Ukraine)
- Died: 20 September 1907 (aged 81); Krzeszowice, Grand Duchy of Kraków, Austria-Hungary (now in Poland)
- Noble family: Branicki
- Spouse: Adam Józef Potocki
- Issue: Róża Potocka; Artur Władysław Potocki; Zofia Potocka; Maria Potocka; Wanda Potocka; Andrzej Kazimierz Potocki; Anna Maria Potocka
- Father: Władysław Grzegorz Branicki
- Mother: Róża Potocka

Countess Katarzyna Potocka, née Branicka (also anglicized as Catherine Potocka; 10 December 1825 – 20 September 1907) was a Polish noblewoman and an art collector.

== Early life and ancestry ==
Korczak coat of arms

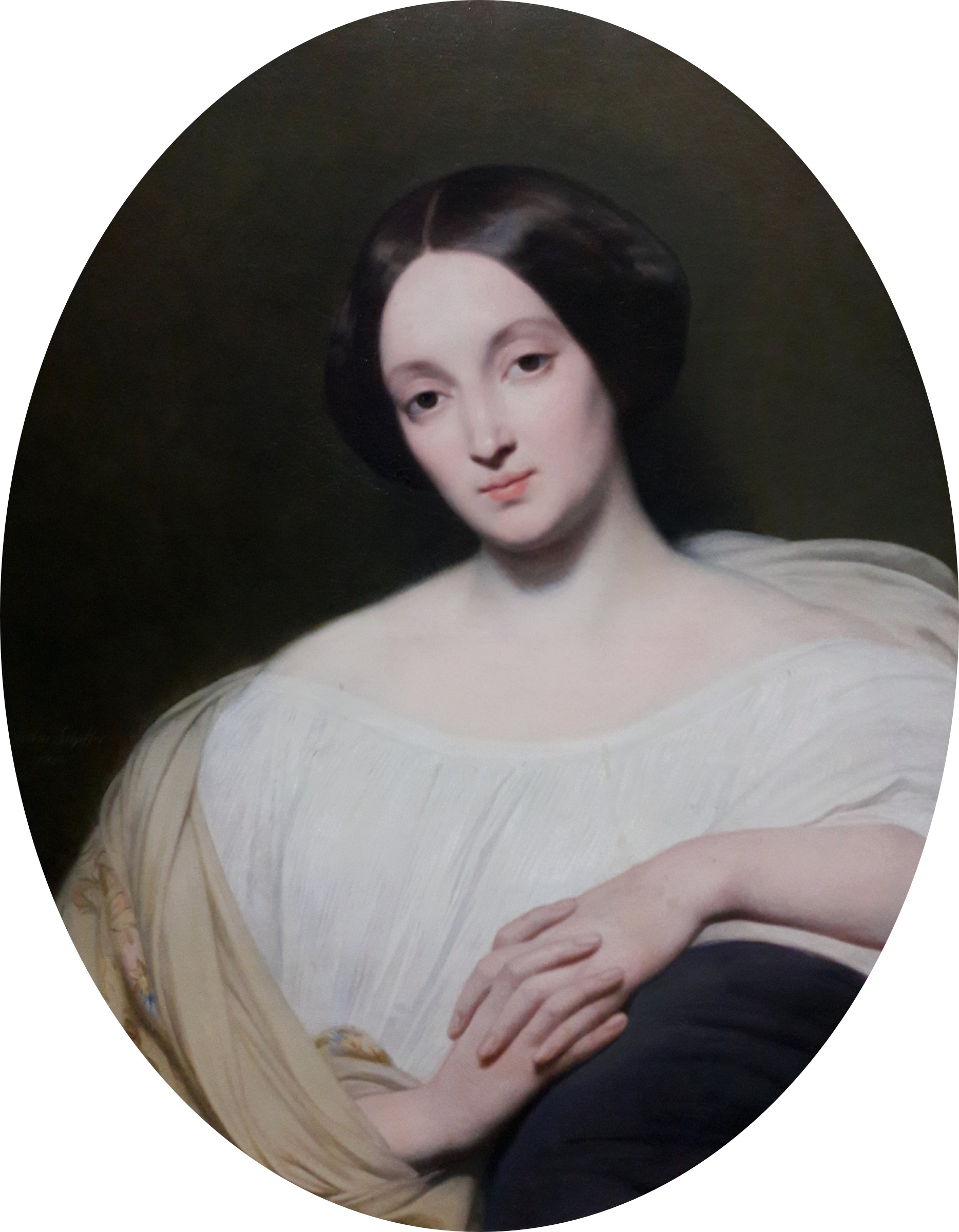
Katarzyna Potocka (1850) by Ary Scheffer, National Museum, Warsaw

Born into the House of Branicki, Katarzyna was the youngest child of Count Wladyslaw Gregorz Branicki (1782–1843) and Countess Rosa Potocka (1780–1862), member of the Potocki family.

Through her paternal grandmother, Countess Aleksandra Branicka, she was a putative great-grandchild of Catherine the Great.

She had two sisters and four brothers, the eldest of whom was the French exile, financier and philanthropist, Count Xavier Branicki.

== Personal life ==
She married her first cousin, Count Adam Józef Potocki on 26 October 1847 in Dresden, member of the Potocki family.

The couple had seven children, two sons and five daughters:

- Countess Róża Potocka (1849–1937), married firstly to Count Władysław Krasiński (1844–1873); married secondly Count Edward Aleksander Raczyński (1847–1926)
- Artur Władysław Potocki (1850–1890), married to Princess Roza Zofia Lubomirska (1860–1881)
- Countess Zofia Potocka (1851–1927), married to Count Stefan Zamoyski
- Countess Marie Potocka (1855–1934), married to Count Adam Sierakowski (1846–1912)
- Countess Wanda Potocka (1859–1878), died unmarried
- Count Andreas Potocki (1861–1908), married Countess Christina Tyszkiewicz (1866–1952)
- Countess Anna Potocka (1863–1953), married Count Xaver Branicki (b. 1864)

== Life ==
Chopin dedicated his Waltz in A-flat major to her. It was the last waltz by Chopin to be published in his lifetime.

She was said to have been a great beauty and the subject of several portrait artists, including in 1854, the German painter, Franz Winterhalter.

== Death ==
Countess Katarzyna died on 20 Sep 1907, aged 81, in Powiat krakowski, Małopolskie. Her body ws buried in the Potocki family crypt the Church of St. Martin in Krzeszowice, Poland.
