= Artur Władysław Potocki =

Polish nobleman (1850–1890)

- Count
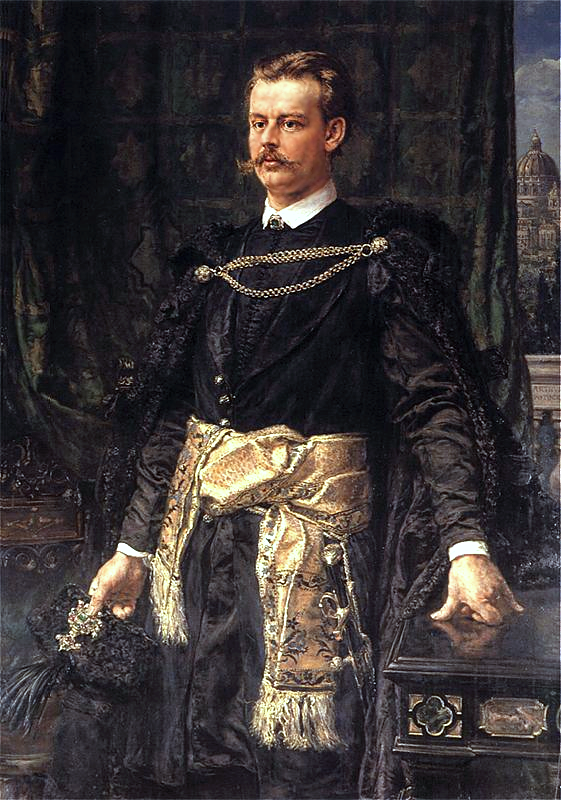
- Portrait by Jan Matejko, 1890
- Coat of arms: Piława
- Born: 14 June 1850; Krzeszowice
- Died: 26 March 1890 (aged 39); Krzeszowice
- Family: Potocki
- Consort: Róża Pelagia Lubomirska
- Issue: Róża Maria Potocka; Zofia Maria Potocka; Anna Potocka
- Father: Adam Józef Potocki
- Mother: Katarzyna Branicka

Count Artur Władysław Józef Maria Potocki (1850–1890) was a Polish nobleman (szlachcic) and an Imperial Chamberlain.

== Early life ==
Born into a rich and powerful House of Potocki, as the second child and elder son of Count Adam Józef Potocki (1822–1872) and his wife, Countess Katarzyna Branicka.

== Biography ==
Artur was owner of Krzeszowice, Staszowskie, Mędrzechów and Biała Cerkiew estates. He was an economic activist, member of the Herrenhaus, Austrian Chamberlain, chairman of an Insure and an Agriculture society, founder of the Cooperative Bank in Krzeszowice and chairman of the Supervisory Board of the Mutual Insurance Society. For some time, Artur kept a romantic relationship with the widowed Crown Crincess Stéphanie of Austria, which was ended by his early death caused by laryngeal cancer.

== Personal life ==
On 7 July 1877 he married Princess Roza Zofia Lubomirska (1860-1881), eldest daughter of Prince Eugene Adolph Lubomirski (1825–1911) and his wife, Countess Roza Zamoyska (1836–1915). Roza Zofia died on childbirth, after giving birth to her last daughter. They had three daughters:

- Countess Roza Potocka (1878–1931); married Prince Maciej Mikolaj Radziwill (1873–1920); they had issue
- Countess Zofia Maria Róza Katarzyna (1879-1933); married Count Zdzislaw Jan Tarnowski (1862–1934); they had issue
- Countess Anna (12 May 1881 — 15 May 1881); died 3 days after birth

== Sources ==
- "Ruda 2(9)". Geographical Dictionary of the Kingdom of Poland (in Polish). 9. Warszawa: Kasa im. Józefa Mianowskiego. 1888. p. 891.
