= Branicki (Korczak) =

Polish noble family

Korczak coat of arms of the Branicki family

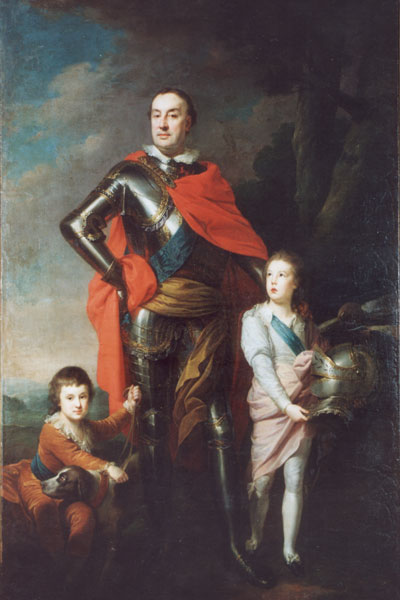
Franciszek Ksawery Branicki

The House of Branicki (plural: Braniccy) was a Polish aristocratic family. The family acquired influence in the Polish–Lithuanian Commonwealth in the 18th century.

== History ==
Not much is known about the Branicki family before the 16th century. Their progenitor was named Paweł, and two of his sons, Jan and Sebastian, were part of the Gniezno chapter. According to Adam Boniecki, the ancestral seat of the Branicki family was most likely located in Branica in the Lublin region, while Teodor Żychliński writes that they took their surname from Brańcza in the Bełz land, which, as he claims, belonged to them in the 15th century. Another possibility is that they originated in Siemień in the Łuków land, as suggested by Jerzy Dunin-Borkowski. Teresa Zielińska concludes that Boniecki was "closest to the truth", citing 16th-century noble court records made in connection with the settlement of property rights to Branica and Zbylutów, in which some members of the family are mentioned. According to her, most probably in the late 16th or at the start of the 17th century, some of the Branickis migrated farther east within the Kingdom of Poland, such as the lands of Halicz and Bełz.

Up until the close of the 17th century, the Branicki family belonged to the lower ranks of the nobility. They rose to significant power and fortune with Franciszek Ksawery Branicki, Great Crown Hetman and one of the leaders of the Targowica Confederation, who amassed large wealth in both money and land. The family owned landed estates in present day Poland and Ukraine.

== Coat of arms ==
The Branicki family used the Korczak coat of arms.

Coat of Arms of Counts Branicki

Coat of Arms of Counts Branicki

== Notable members ==
- Sebastian Branicki (d. 1544), Bishop of Chełm, Bishop of Poznań, Crown referendary, patron of Lubrański Academy.
- Józef Branicki (d. 1682), łowczy of Bełz
- Józef Branicki (d. 1735), stolnik of Busk, castellan of Halicz
- Piotr Franciszek Branicki (d. 1762), castellan of Bracław, father of Franciszek Ksawery
- Franciszek Ksawery Branicki (c. 1730–1819), Great Hetman of the Crown, member of the Targowica Confederation, first in the family to be owner of landed estate in Biała Cerkiew
- Elżbieta Branicka (c. 1734–1800), mother of Kazimierz Nestor Sapieha
- Władysław Grzegorz Branicki (1783–1843), owner of landed estate in Biała Cerkiew
- Zofia Branicka (1790–1879), wife of Artur Potocki
- Franciszek Ksawery Branicki (1816–1879), financier and political activist in France (Great Emigration)
- Eliza Krasińska, née Branicka (1820–1876), wife of poet Zygmunt Krasiński
- Aleksander Branicki (1821–1877), owner of landed estate in Sucha, collector, traveller, naturalist
- Konstanty Branicki (1824–1884), ornithologist, collector, traveller
- Katarzyna Branicka (1825–1907), wife of Adam Józef Potocki
- Władysław Michał Branicki (1826–1884), owner of landed estate in Biała Cerkiew
- Władysław Branicki (1848–1914), owner of landed estate in Sucha
- Ksawery Branicki (1864–1926), naturalist, landowner, since 1892 owner of Wilanów
- Adam Branicki (1892–1947), the last male member of the Branicki family of the Korczak Coat of Arms and last owner of Wilanów (before nationalisation)
- Anna Branicka-Wolska (1924-2023), the last living female of the Branicki family of the Korczak Coat of Arms, wife of Tadeusz Wolski
- Beata Maria Branicka (1926–1988), member of the Armia Krajowa, she participated in the Warsaw Uprising of 1944, wife of Leszek Rybiński
- Jennah Karthes de Branicka (1982- ), German singer, actress and television presenter, 9th-generation descendant of the Polish noble House of Branicki

== Palaces ==
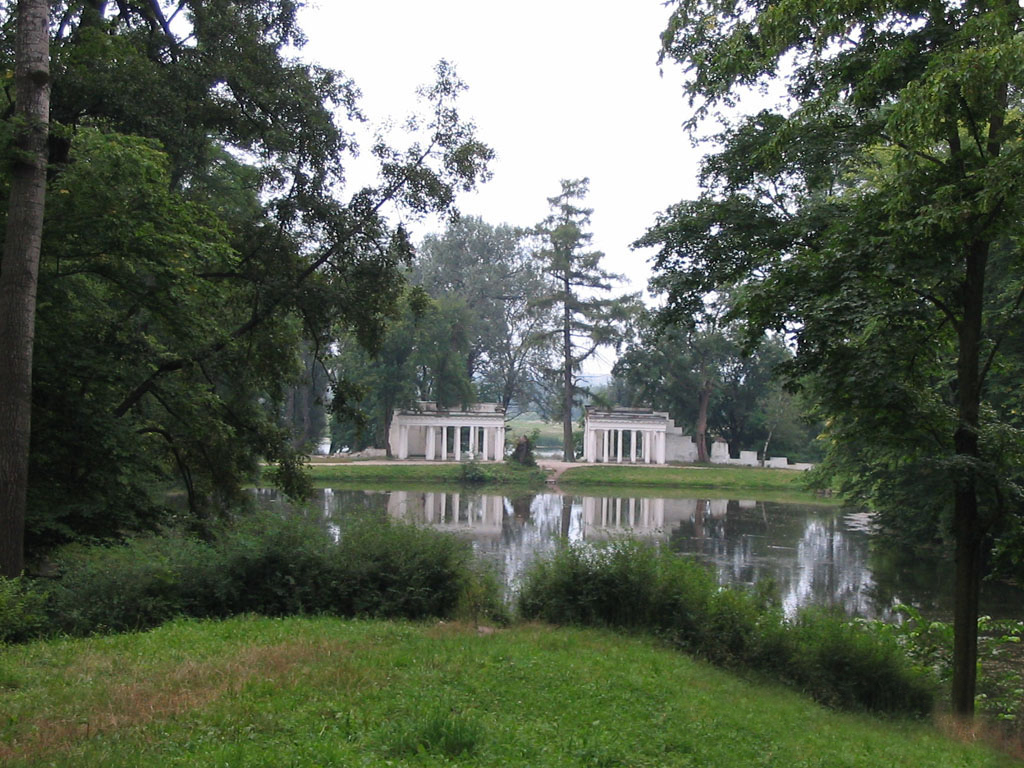
Ruins of the Palace in Aleksandria near Biała Cerkiew

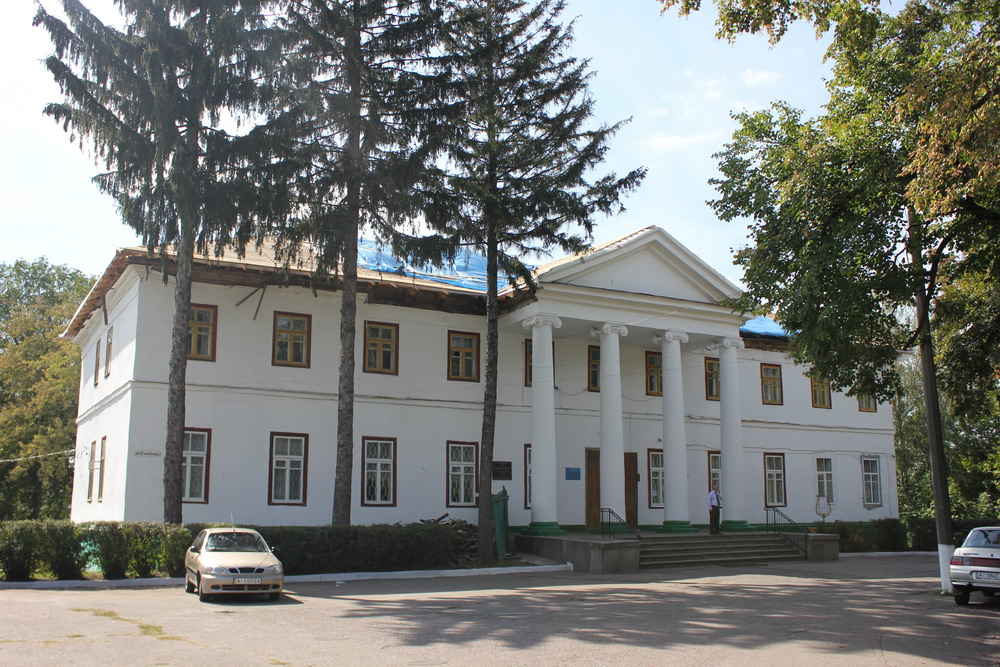
Winter Palace in w Biała Cerkiew

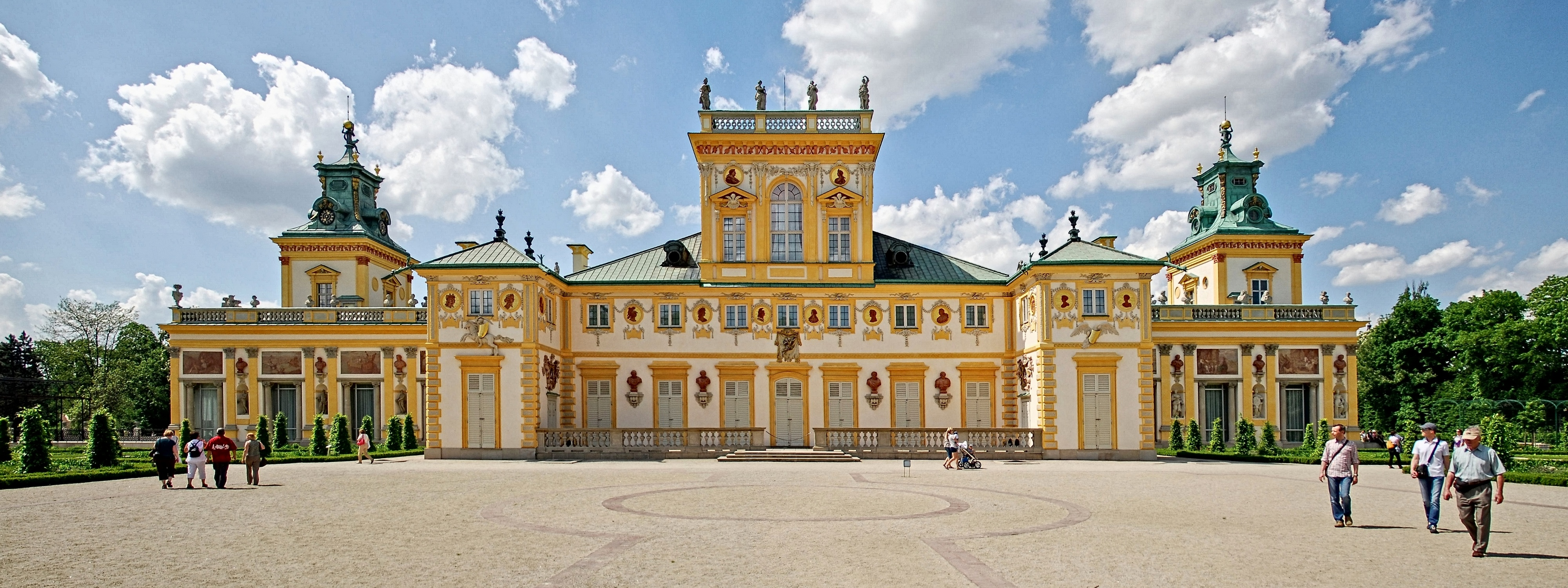
Palace in Wilanów

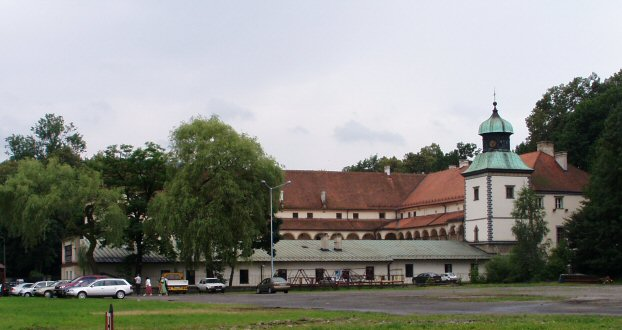
Castle in Sucha Beskidzka

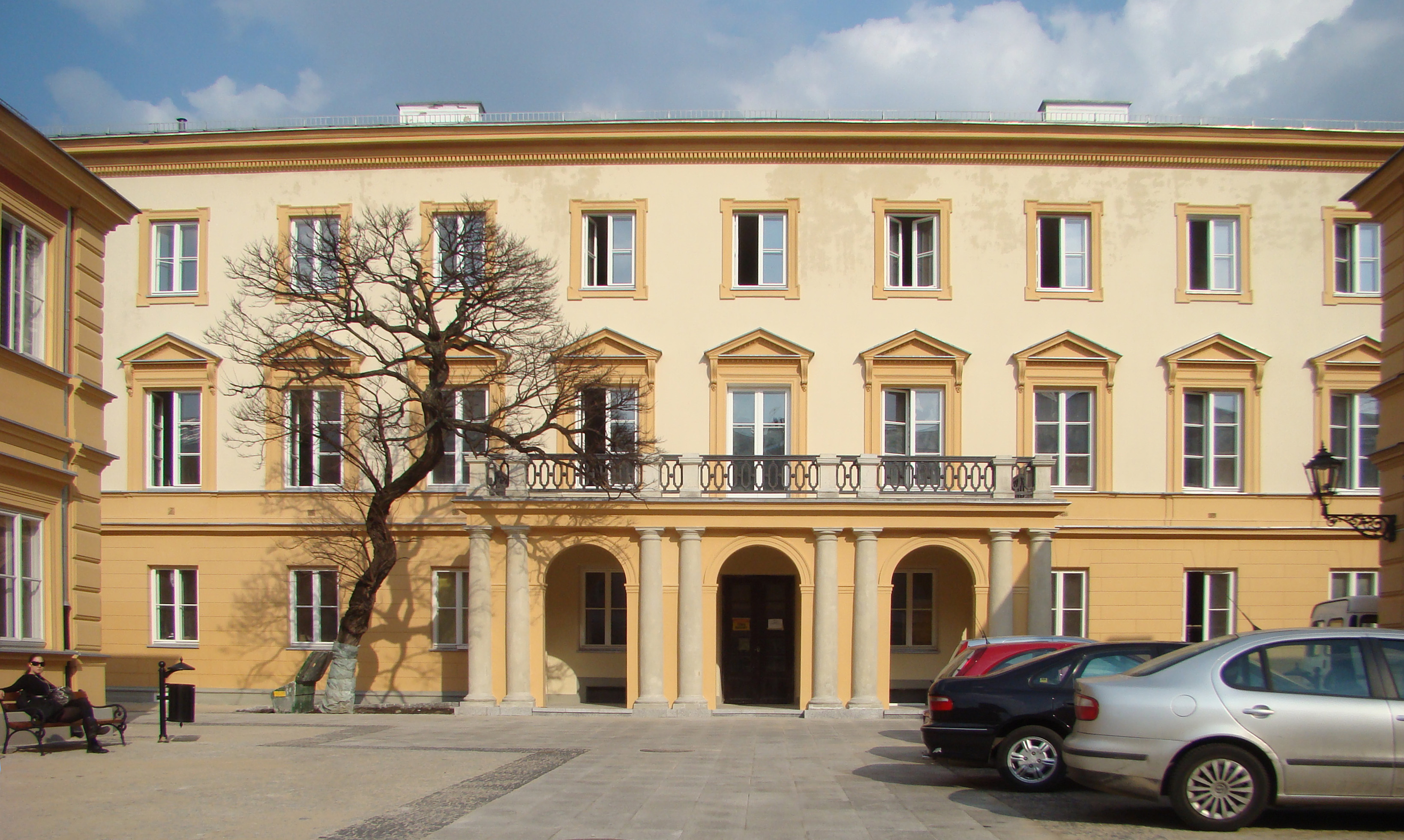
Branicki Palace in Warsaw (Nowy Świat)

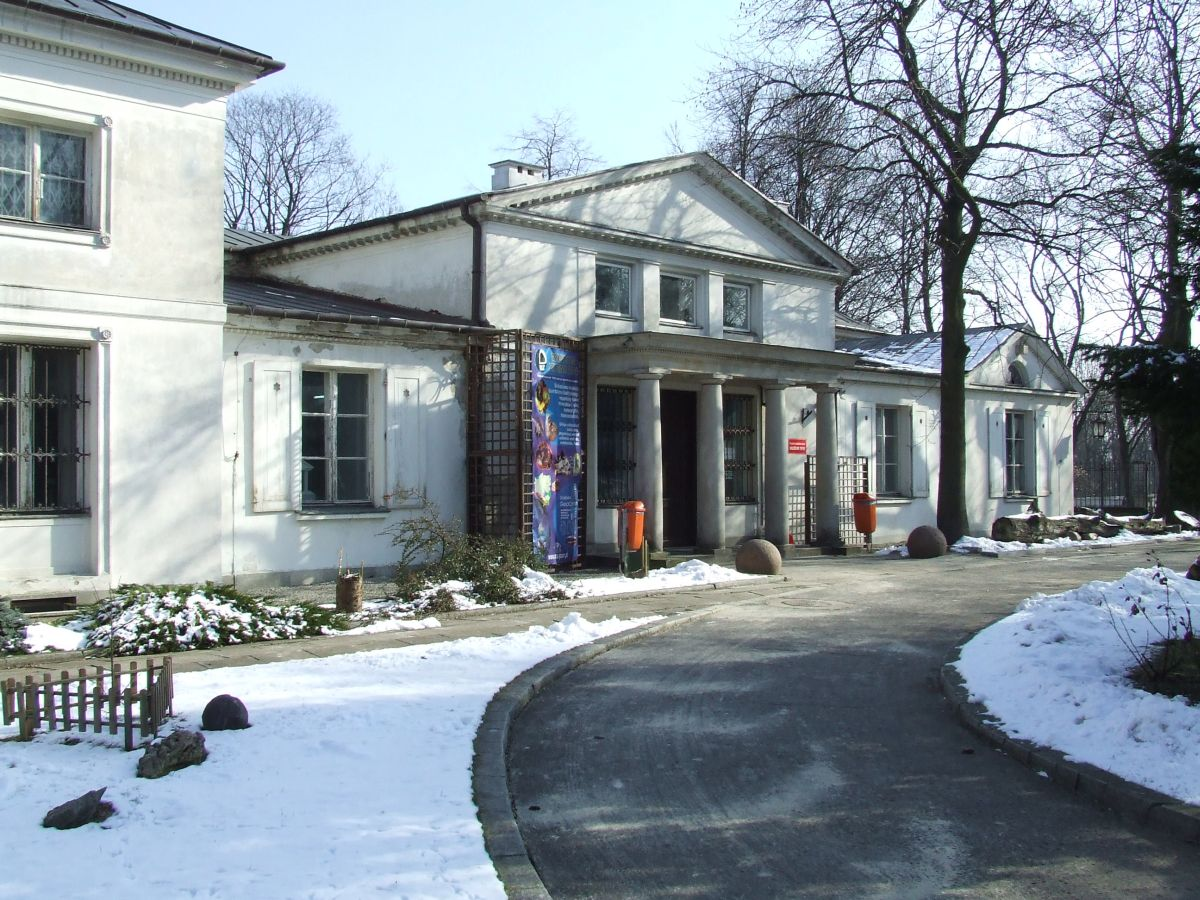
White Palace in Warsaw

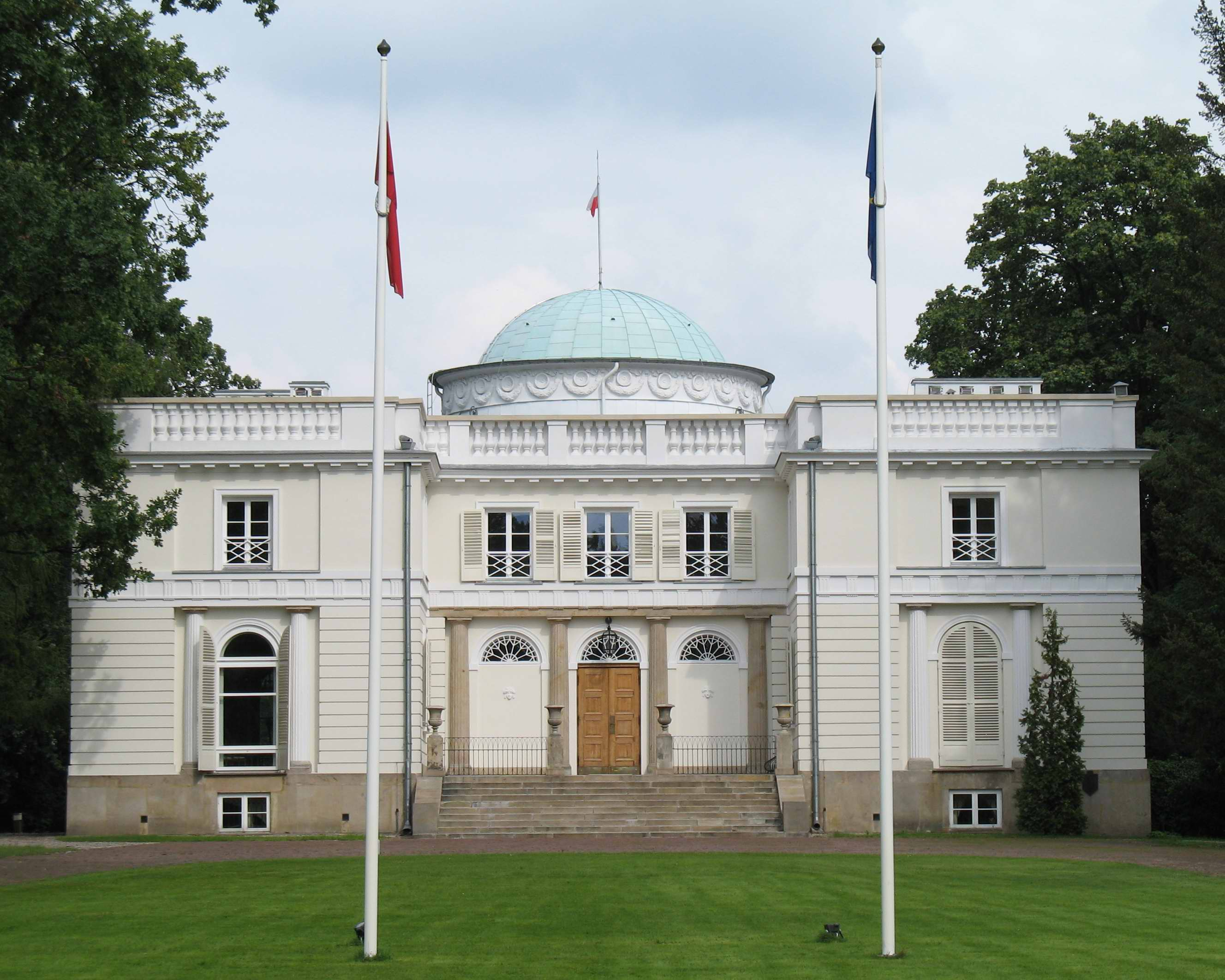
Palace in Natolin

== See also ==
- Branicki (Gryf) family
- Branicki Residential House
