= Franciszek Ksawery Branicki =

Polish nobleman (1730–1819)

Hetman Franciszek Ksawery Branicki
- Great Crown Hetman; Field Crown Hetman
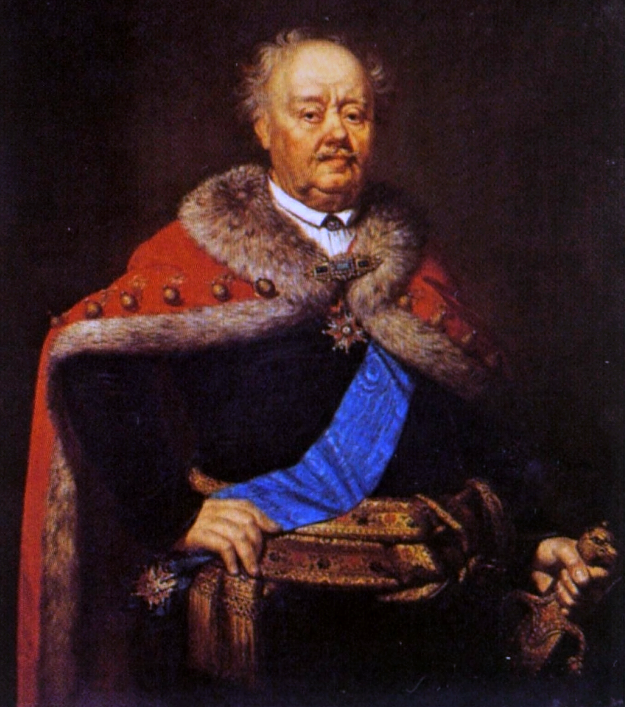

- Coat of arms: Korczak
- Born: 1730; Barwałd Górny, Polish–Lithuanian Commonwealth (now Poland)
- Died: April 1819 (aged 88–89); Biała Cerkiew, Russian Empire (now Bila Tserkva, Ukraine)
- Noble family: Branicki
- Spouse: Aleksandra von Engelhardt
- Issue: Katarzyna Branicka; Aleksander Branicki; Władysław Grzegorz Branicki; Zofia Branicka; Elżbieta Branicka
- Father: Piotr Branicki
- Mother: Melania Teresa Szembek

Franciszek Ksawery Branicki (1730–1819) was a Polish nobleman, magnate, French count, diplomat, politician, military commander, and one of the leaders of the Targowica Confederation. Many consider him to have been a traitor who participated with the Russians in the dismemberment of his nation.

== Early life ==
Born into the mighty House of Branicki, he was the son Piotr Branicki, Chorąży of Halicz, Castellan of Bratslav (1708–1762) and his wife, Melania Teresa Szembek (b. 1712). He was the brother of Princess Elżbieta Sapieha.

== Career ==
He was appointed Great Crown Podstoli in 1764, Ambassador to Berlin in 1765, Master of the Hunt of the Crown in 1766–1773, Artillery General of Lithuania in 1768–1773, Ambassador to Moscow in 1771, Crown Hetman in 1773 and was Great Crown Hetman of the Polish–Lithuanian Commonwealth between 1774 and 1794.

In 1774, Stanisław August Poniatowski ceded to him, as mark of his confidence and esteem, the immense estate of Bila Tserkva in the Kiev Voivodeship. He opposed the reforms of the Great Sejm (1788–1792), and supported the Hetman Party instead.

During the Kościuszko Uprising (1794) he was sentenced by the Supreme Criminal Court, in absentia, to hang for treason, witness his decades long pro-Russian stance and anti-patriotic politics and plotting against the state, the Polish-Lithuanian Commonwealth. However, he escaped the death penalty.

Branicki was awarded the Order of the White Eagle in December 1764. He married Aleksandra von Engelhardt, member of the powerful Engelhardt family. She was supposed niece of Prince Potemkin, which made him the putative son-in-law of Empress Catherine of Russia.

== Biography ==
He started his career as a soldier in the Seven Years' War, firstly in the Russian Imperial army and later with the French. He distinguished himself at the battle of Sarbinowo (Zorndorf) in 1758 while commanding a squadron of Russian cavalry. For his services in the French army Louis XV awarded him the title of count, however, in Poland, prior to the partitions, the title was not officially recognized by parliament.

In 1765, he became a Knight of the Order of Saint Stanislaus. He became a member of the Polish Sajm in 1762 representing the Ruthenian Voivodeship (later known as Galicia). He inherited his father's noble titles. In 1764, Branicki was one of the Electors of Stanisław August Poniatowski who reigned as Stanisław II August. Branicki later became a member of the Military Commission of the Crown. In 1766, he gave a speech in the Sejm on behalf of Halicz county.

Branicki was a strong supporter and member of the Radom Confederation and mostly focused on how to weaken the influence of Karol Stanisław "Panie Kochanku" Radziwiłł and possibly, on how to deprive Radziwiłł of his fortune. In 1767, as a member of the Repnin Sejm of Sochaczew, he became a member of the pro-Russian delegation, which was created under the Russian envoy Nikolai Repnin in order to review the function of the government of the Polish–Lithuanian Commonwealth.

As a commander, Branicki decided to side with the king and faithfully led the Royal Polish Army in the years 1768–1772 and helped to suppress the supporters of the Bar Confederation who were Polish patriots. On 19 June 1768, together with Russian troops, he captured the city of Bar in Ruthenia, which served as the Bar's headquarters.

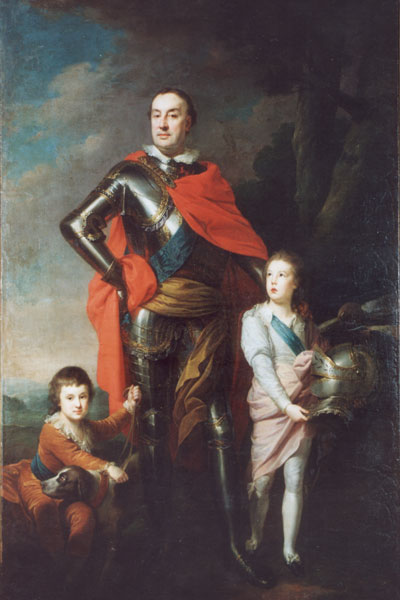
Franciszek Ksawery Branicki

In 1770, during the crisis in Russian-Polish relations, king Stanisław II Augustus, appointed him as his envoy to the Russian Empire, without consulting with the powerful Czartoryski family, who were normally responsible for nominating envoys, Sejm Marshals and Hetmans. On 18 January 1771 Branicki arrived in St. Petersburg, from where he warned king Stanisław that if the Russian delegation in Warsaw headed by general Kasper von Saldern could not reach agreement with the Polish Sejm, the Russian Empress would partition the country. So it came to pass.

He and Suvorov armed the Jews in Kraków, the ancient capital of Poland for the siege of Kraków Castle. The French and Bar confederation garrison of the castle were kept as prisoners, but he declared that Poland had never been at war with France. In 1772, he went on a diplomatic mission to Paris to receive the French aid against partitions similar to the French aid to Bar confederation but in vain. Between 1773 and 1775, he was a member of a newly established secret party, responsible for confiscating the assets of the Society of Jesus in the entire country. For his "services", Stanisław Augustus rewarded him in 1774 by ceding to him the immense estate that was the county of Biała Cerkiew and appointed him Crown Hetman.

In 1776, Branicki became a member of Andrzej Mokronowski's controversial political party. At the 1778 Sejm Branicki was appointed the adviser to the "Permanent Council's" Chief Marshal.

Later he became a member of the Great Sejm and chairman of the Military Commission of the Commonwealth. He was an implacable opponent of the reforms proposed by the Sejm in its Constitution of 3 May. In league with the Russian envoys in Warsaw, he co-founded the traitorous Confederation of Targowica.

Branicki was included on Yakov Bulhakov's list, which included the names of people, mostly senators and deputies, on whom the Russians could rely and were keen to overthrow the latest Constitution, and possibly even the monarch himself. Throughout his career, Branicki had been one of the leaders of the pro-Russian political tendency.

As a conservative, along with the founder of Bar confederation Bishop Kajetan Sołtyk, Branicki tried everything to keep his former Hetman privileges. Even as a determined counter-revolutionary, he supposedly refused to sign any treaty that sanctioned the partitioning of his homeland.

However, due to his sympathies and cooperation with the Russians, Branicki was considered throughout the 19th-century as a national traitor, along with all the leaders and members of the Targowica Confederation, which was essentially a conspiracy against the state and led to second and third partitions of Poland.

Branicki held several important posts in the Commonwealth, as Crown Hetman, then Great Hetman. Additionally, he was commander of the Lithuanian artillery. On 13 August 1793 he resigned from that position in order to become a general in the Russian army. The ownership of vast estates, towns and villages in Ruthenia (Polish Ukraine) made him one of the most powerful and wealthy Polish magnates. His enduring rival was Karol Stanisław Radziwiłł, a zealous patriot and one of the richest men in Europe. After 1775 Branicki took up residence in Biała Cerkiew near Kiev, where he spent the last years of his life, having retired from politics and military service.

== Family ==
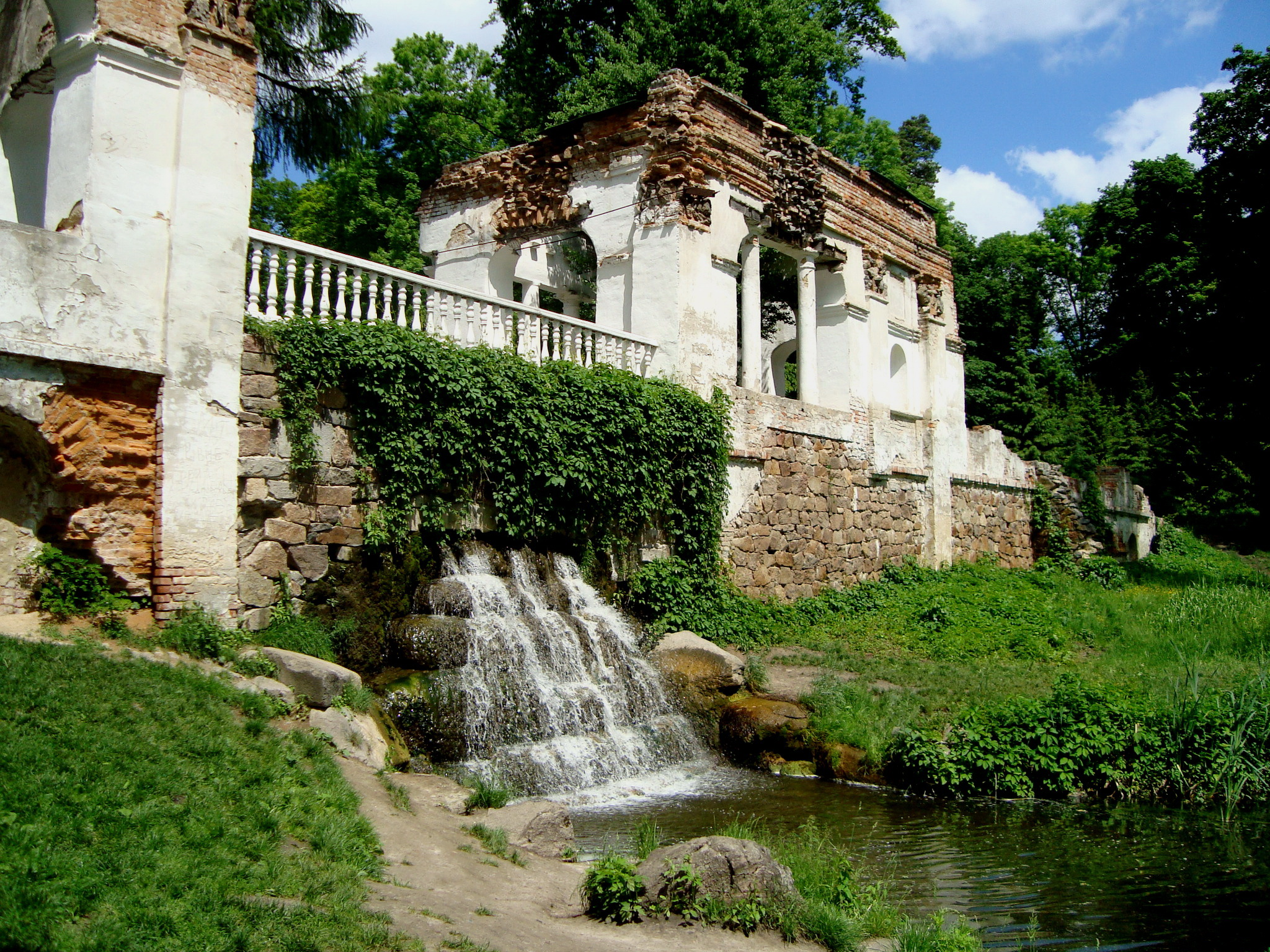
A memorial waterfall in Oleksandriya

In 1781 already aged 51, Branicki contracted a strategic marriage with one of the leading members of the imperial court, Alexandra von Engelhardt, almost 25 years younger, the niece of Potemkin and, according to court gossips, his lover and even the illegitimate daughter of Catherine the Great. Though she most probably was not the daughter of Catherine II, the marriage sealed the Tsarina's foothold in the Commonwealth of Two Nations, already in the process of disintegration. The new Countess Branicka, who was inordinately close to Prince Potemkin until his death, became the Chatelaine of Biała Cerkiew amidst many other possessions across territories of modern Poland and Ukraine. Despite her extra-marital interest, the marriage was said to be harmonious. Due to her business acumen and contacts, she was able to cover her husband's colossal debts. In return, he spent even more money in creating Oleksandriya, an impossibly lavish summer palace and park in her honour, making it the epitome of Polish classicism. They had five surviving children: Katarzyna, Aleksander, Władysław Grzegorz, Zofia, and Elżbieta.

As a memorial to their children who did not survive, the couple had a waterfall and folly constructed in the grounds of Oleksandriya.

== Treason ==
=== Death sentence ===
During the Kościuszko Insurrection, the Supreme Court of the Kingdom of Poland sentenced him to death by hanging, to eternal infamy and to the confiscation of all his property and titles. Because of the absence of the accused, the sentence was carried out symbolically in absentia on 29 September 1794. His portrait, painted by an anonymous artist was hung from the gallows. The portraits of Stanisław Szczęsny Potocki and Hetman Seweryn Rzewuski, who were not captured either, but were convicted for treason, were also hung the same day.

=== Infamy ===
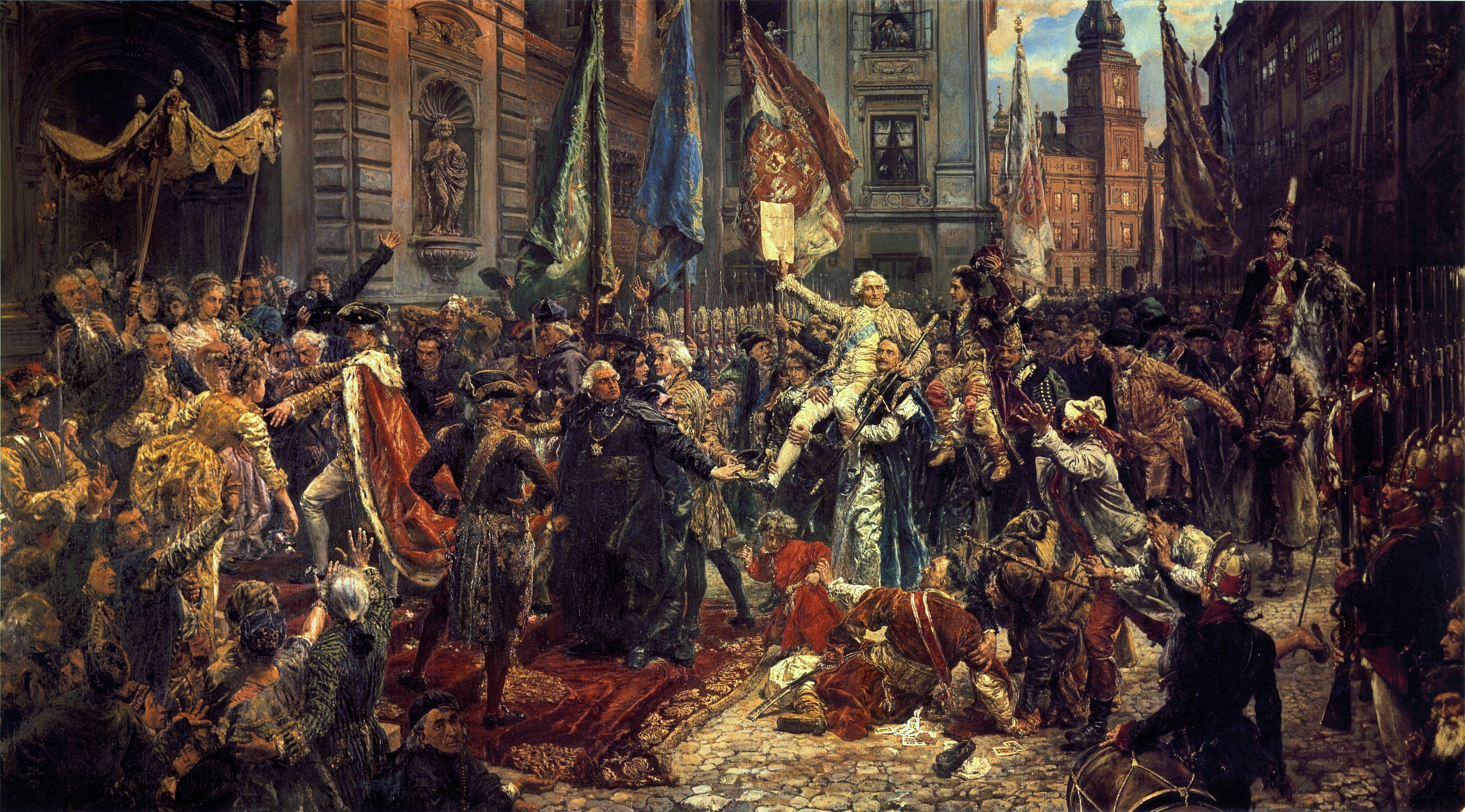
Constitution of 3 May 1791 by Jan Matejko

Branicki's reputation was subsequently immortalized as a symbol of national treason by Poland's leading writers and artists, most notably by Stanisław Wyspiański. Branicki had been a brawler, but a close friend of King Stanisław II Augustus. He liked to give the impression of a great military strategist and leader – but according to historians, he hardly equalled the ability of Russian cavalry colonels, despite his supposed bravery during the Seven Years' War. After that conflict he was praised by some but hated by others, especially among the Polish royal court, who considered him an enemy to be quickly eliminated. He was seen as a stubborn and obstinate man, always claiming to know best. He was also generally disliked by the Polish nobility. Branicki was described as selfish and prone to overweening pride. He was in constant rivalry with other powerful magnates such as, Karol Stanisław "Panie Kochanku" Radziwiłł.

== Trivia ==
In 1766, as a result of a pistol duel over an Italian actress in Warsaw with the adventurer and notorious predator, Giacomo Casanova, who happened to be in Poland at that time, Branicki sustained a serious wound to his stomach. Casanova was injured in the hand and was recommended an amputation which he declined. They both survived.

== Representations in art ==
He is one of the figures immortalized in Jan Matejko's 1891 painting, Constitution of 3 May 1791.

Branicki's greed, treason and baronial excesses appear in Stanisław Wyspiański's drama, The Wedding (Wesele).

== Bibliography ==
In Polish:

- Historia Dyplomacji Polskiej – tom II 1572-1795, PWN, Warsaw 1981, p. 541.
- Marek Ruszczyc, Dzieje rodu i fortuny Branickich, Warsaw 1991.
- Roman Kaleta, Oświeceni i sentymentalni, Wrocław 1971.
