= Aleksander Branicki =

Polish traveller and collector (1821–1877)

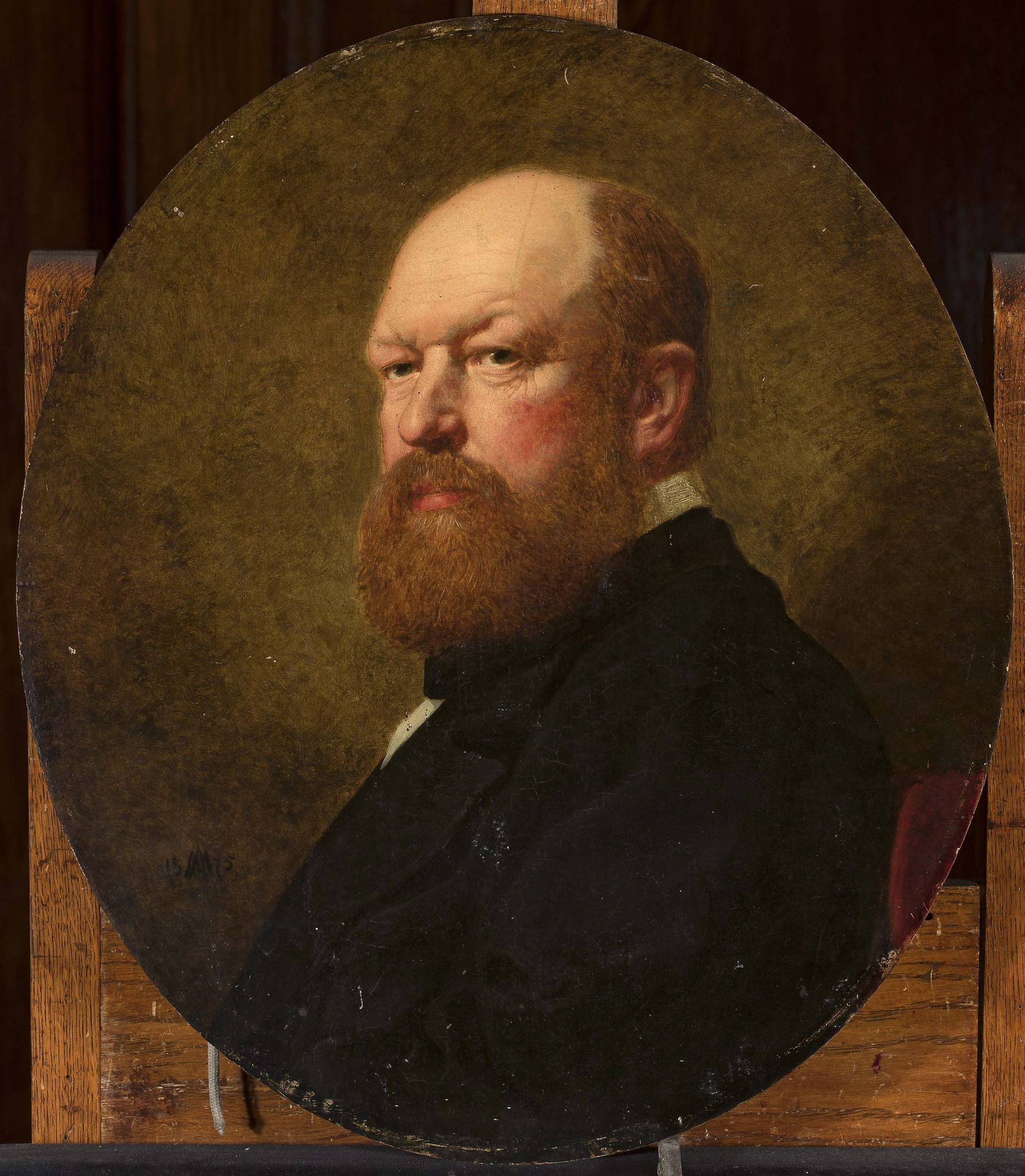
Portrait c. 1875 by Andrzej Jerzy Mniszech (1823–1905)

Aleksander Branicki (1821 – 20 October 1877) was a Polish traveller, collector, and naturalist. He was a member of the Polish aristocratic family: House of Branicki (Korczak). He owned Sucha castle.

== Life and work ==
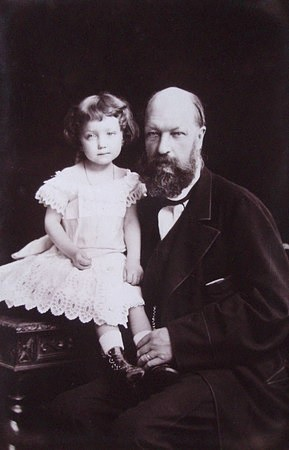
Aleksander Branicki with his granddaughter Maria (1875) by Gustave Le Gray

Branicki was born in Byla Tserkva (now in Ukraine) to Władysław Grzegorz and Róża née Potocki. He grew up in St Petersburg and for his participation in the January Uprising, he was sent by the Tsarist authorities to Saratov and then banished from his home. In 1843 he inherited the fortunes of his father and moved to purchase Sucha Castle in Beskid Makowski (then part of Galicia) from Ludwik Filip de Saint-Genois. He then took an interest in travelling around the world beginning with expeditions to Egypt and Nubia. His collections included four mummies from Egypt including one that was donated to the museum in Vilnius. Along with his brother Konstanty, they established a large collection of natural history specimens. Branicki also took an interest in photography and horses. On 9 March 1871 he was titled a count by Russia.

Branicki married Nina Anna Hołyńska (1824–1907) of the Klamry family and they had a son, Władysław (1848-1914). He died in Nice.
