= Adam Józef Potocki =

Polish politician (1822–1872)

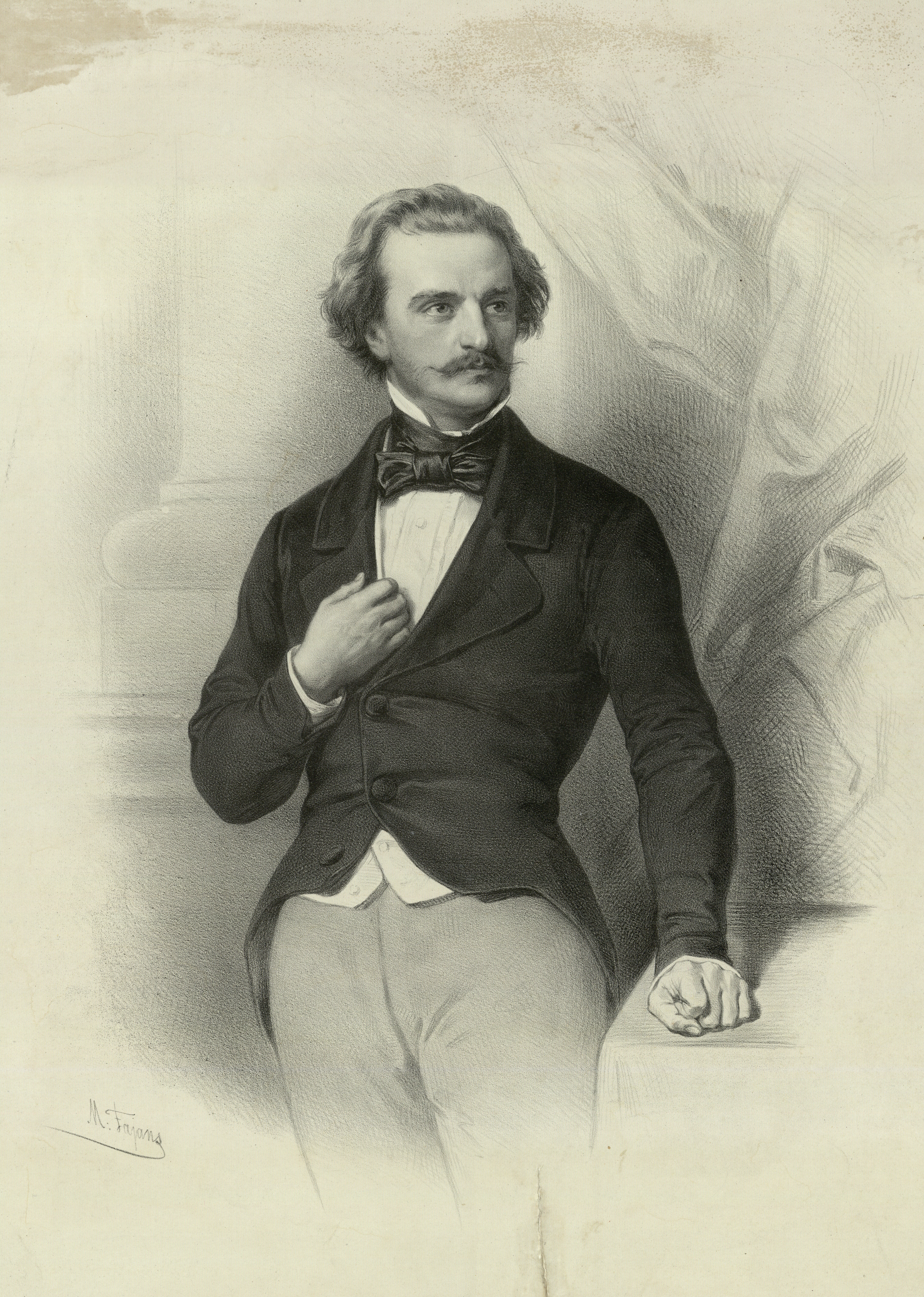
Adam Józef Potocki; portrait by Maksymilian Fajans (c. 1850)

Count Adam Józef Potocki (24 February 1822, Łańcut – 15 June 1872, Krzeszowice) was a Polish politician from Galicia, who was a prominent advocate for the autonomy of that region. He owned numerous estates, steel mills in Silesia, and shares in the consortium building Galicia's railway lines.

== Biography ==
He was the son of an army officer, Count Artur Potocki, and his wife, Zofia née Countess Branicka, a well-known art collector. He initially studied at the University of Vienna then, from 1839 to 1840, at the University of Edinburgh and, in 1841, completed his studies at the University of Berlin.

Following the Kraków uprising of 1846, he supported the resolution that would have maintained it as a Free City, but it was annexed by Austria. In 1847 he married Countess Katarzyna Branicka, a distant relative of his mother, in Dresden. They had four children: Róża, who married a landowner, Artur, a politician and insurance executive, Andrzej, a politician, and Zofia.

His first involvement in politics came during the Revolutions of 1848. That year, he was elected to the Imperial Diet, representing a constituency in Kraków, but resigned after only a few months, following a failed attempt to rescind the ordinance prohibiting political refugees from entering the city. Shortly after, he became a commander in the National Guard. After the defeat of the Revolution, he was sentenced to six years in prison, but was pardoned in 1852,

He returned to politics and, from 1861, was a member of the Diet of Galicia and Lodomeria and was chosen to represent that area in the Imperial Council, and was one of the 34 members who rejected the Austro-Hungarian Compromise of 1867. He served until 1870 when he resigned as part of a general protest against the government's continued refusal to grant autonomy to Galicia.

In addition to his political career, he was active as a journalist and was one of the founders of Czas ("Time"), a political magazine that was published until 1939. He died of "paralysis".
