= Korczak coat of arms =

Polish coat of arms

Korczak
- Alternative names: Cittus, Ciphus, Karpie, Trzy Wręby, Wrębowie, Wręby
- Earliest mention: 1142
- Cities: Biłgoraj, Pruchnik, Szczebrzeszyn
- Gminas: Gmina Pruchnik, Gmina Goraj, Biłgoraj County, Kraśnik County
- Families: 418 names B Bałaban, Bannuński, Banunyński, Bargielski, Barsowski, Barzi, Batkiewicz, Batkowski, Bedleński, Bedlewicz, Bernaszowski, Bibel, Bibelski, Bieniewski, Biernacki, Biernaszewski, Biernaszowski, Biernawski, Bierzawski, Bierżawski, Biliźniewski, Bliziński, Bochowityn, Bohdanowicz, Bohowityn, Bolanowski, Bołabyn, Boratyński, Borszewski, Borszowski, Bortkiewicz, Bortnicki, Bortnowski, Bożydar, Branicki, Bratko, Bronowicki, Bucewicz, Bybelski, Bybłowski. C Chaniewski, Chańkowski, Chański, Chęciński, Chiszewski, Choderowski, Chodorowski, Chodorski, Choiński, Chołoniewski, Choński, Chorbowski, Chryczewski, Chryszczewski, Chulawski, Chyczewski, Chyrowski, Chyszewski, Ciupa, Ciuppa, Czarnkowski, Czaryski, Czasza, Czaszkowski, Czerniejewski, Czerniejowski, Czupa, Czuppa, Czuryło D Dachnowicz, Daleszyński, Dąbkowski, Deben, Derewiński, Derszniak, Derwiński, Deubell, Dobraczewski, Dobraczyński, Dremlik, Drewiński, Drogojewski, Drohojewski, Drohojowski, Drożawski, Drzemlik, Drzewiński, Dunicki, Dusieński, Duszeński, Dworskowicz, Dworszowicz, Dziechciejewski, Dziechciewski. E Esman. G Gacki, Gadowski, Garbula, Gliński, Gluziński, Gorajewski, Gorajski, Goralski, Gorodecki, Gornowski, Góralski, Gruszowski, Gruświcki, Grządzielski, Grzegorczyk, Gwoździecki. H Hacicki, Hajski, Hałuszyński, Hanicki, Hankowski, Hanusiewicz, Hanusowicz, Hański, Henko, Hinek, Hlib, Hodorowski, Hołodyński, Hołoniewski, Hołowicki, Horaim, Horbaczewski, Horbanowski, Horbowski, Hornowski, Horodeński, Horodyjski, Horodyński, Horodyski, Hoszewski, Hościsławski, Hreczyna, Hruszowski, Hruszwicki, Hubicki, Hynek, Hyńko. I Ilcewicz, Ilinicz, Iliński. J Jagodowski, Jagusiński, Jagużyński, Jarkowski, Jarmoliński, Jaskółowski, Jeleński, Jenkiewicz, Jeśman, Jewłaszko, Jewłaszkowicz, Junkowicz, Jusewicz, Jussewicz. K Kadłubicki, Kadłubiński, Kadłubiski, Kadłubski, Klimek, Kamota, Karaczewski, Karaffa, Kołmowski, Komar, Komorowski, Komota, Konarzewski, Koprowski, Korbowski, Korbułtowski, Korbut, Korbutowicz, Korczak, Korczakowski, Korczmiński, Korytyński, Kotowicz, Kozieradzki, Krasnodąbski, Krężelewski, Krężelowski, Krężylowski, Krężyłowski, Krukieniecki, Krukieński, Krukiewnicki, Krupel, Krupiński, Krupski, Krzeczeński, Krzeczewski, Krzeczkowski, Krzeczowski, Krzywopis, Krzywopisz, Kukizowski. L Lachodowski, Lahodowski, Larkowski, Langowski, Ledeński, Leszczyński, Liniewski, Lipski, Luskowski, Luszkowski. Ł Łachodowski, Ładomicki, Łagodowicz, Łahodowicz, Łahodowski, Łangowski, Łaniewski, Łęgowski, Łohodowicz, Łojowicz, Łopata, Łopatka, Łopatyński, Łopot, Łopott, Łuczak, Łuczkiewicz, Łukszyński, Łuszczewski, Łuszczkowski, Łuszczykowski, Łuszczyński, Łyszczewski, Łyszczyński. M Machalski, Malczycki, Manuwir, Massalski, Melechowicz, Meleszkiewicz, Meleszko, Meleszkowicz, Michalewski, Michalski, Miedzielski, Mieleszko, Mikulec, Miszka, Miszkiewicz, Mitarski, Mleczko, Moczylski, Mogielnicki, Mogilnicki, Morochowski, Mroczkowscy, Muchalski, Myszka. N Niegardowski, Niwicki. O Oladowski, Oratowski, Orbowski, Orczysławski, Ornowski, Orzeszko, Orzewski, Ostrowski, Ostróg, Oszczysławski, Oszmirniec, Ościsławski. P Pawłosek, Pawłowicz, Perwaniecki, Piśnicki, Płoskoński, Podhorodeński, Podhorodeński Bożydar, Podhorodyński, Podobiedow, Podwerbecki, Podwerbski, Pogolia, Portanty, Porwaniecki, Procenko, Próchnicki, Pruchnicki, Przedzielnicki, Przyłubski, Przyłupski, Pyszyński R Rocimirski, Richlik (Rychlik), Rozborski, Ryncz, Rynek, Rynka, Ryński. S Saczko, Sadłocha, Salomoński, Saładykowski, Sałomuński, Samplewski, Sampławski, Saporowski, Serebczyński, Serebryski, Sidecki, Sielecki, Sielicki, Siennoski, Siwicki, Siwiec, Siennowski, Siladowski, Silicz, Silnicki, Siwiński, Skabłoński, Skoruta, Smiotanka, Smykowski, Sołomiński, Sołomuński, Sowa, Sozański, Stawski, Strus, Strusiewicz, Struszkiewicz, Struś, Sołtan, Suszcz, Sutkowski, Sutyski, Swarzyczewski, Synkowski, Szaczko, Szakłakowski, Szampławski, Szczaska, Szczebiński, Szerebiński, Szloczkowski, Szukajło, Szumbarski, Szumlański, Szumliński. Ś Śledziewski, Śledziński, Śliwiński, Śmiotanka, Świdło, Świdłowski, Świeżyński, Świniuski. T Tamanowski, Tankowski, Tańkowski, Tąkiel, Terechowicz, Tomanowicki, Tomanowski, Troszek, Truchanowski, Truchnowski, Truchowski, Tur, Turek, Tychonowicz. U Ulczycki, Umiastowski. W Wańko, Warkowski, Wasiciński, Wasiczyński, Wasielkowski, Wasilkowski, Wasiutyński, Wasylkowski, Waszczyński, Waszczyński, Wereszczyński, Wesołowski, Wierchnowski, Wierzchołowski, Wierzchowski, Witaliszowski, Wojciechowski, Wojna, Wojnałowicz, Wołod, Wołodyjowski, Worotyński, Woszczowski, Woyna, Wujachewicz, Wujakiewicz, Wytycz. Z Zahorowski, Zajęcznicki, Zajęczyński, Zakoszewski, Zaranek, Zaranek, Zarański, Zborowski, Zegart, Ziołkowski, Ziółkowski, Zoratyński, Zorawiński. Ż Żelazko, Żoratyński, Żorawiński, Żórawiński, Żórawnicki

Korczak is a Polish coat of arms. It was used by several noble families of Clan Korczak in the Kingdom of Poland and the Polish–Lithuanian Commonwealth.

== History ==
The coat of arms has Hungarian origins; the three bars represent the Danube, Tisza (or Drava), and Sava rivers. Earliest mention – 1142 annum (Ogród królewski, Paprocki Bartłomiej, D. Siedlczański, Praga, 1599). The first mention of the coat of arms was 1368, while the oldest known seal bearing the coat dates to 1432. The Gorajscy family was the first to use the seal.

== Notable bearers ==
Notable bearers of this coat of arms include:

- Komorowski family
  - Tadeusz Bór-Komorowski, general
  - Anna Maria Komorowska, mother of Queen Mathilde of Belgium
  - Gertruda Komorowska
- Branicki family
  - Franciszek Ksawery Branicki
  - Katarzyna Branicka
  - Władysław Grzegorz Branicki
  - Zofia Branicka
- Horodyski family
- Bronisław Komorowski, President of Poland
- Ivan Horbachevsky (1854–1942), Ukrainian chemist and politician.
- Maria Zankovetska (1854–1934, Ukrainian actress
- Yosyf Shumlyansky (1643–1708), bishop
- Aleksandra Ziolkowska-Boehm
- Korczak Ziolkowski
- Dymitr z Goraja
- Boris Korczak
- Stefan Horodyński
- Józef Wereszczyński, 16th century bishop

== Gallery ==
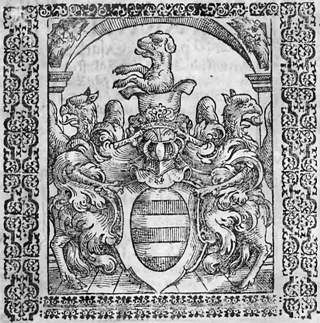
Coat of arms Princes of Slavonia

Branicki

Counts Choloniewski

Counts Branicki

Counts Komorowski

Bedlewicz, variant of Korczak

Bedlewicz II, variant of Korczak

Hornowski, variant of Korczak

Korczak II

Korczak V

Korczak VII

Silicz, variant of Korczak

Lyszczynski, variant of Korczak

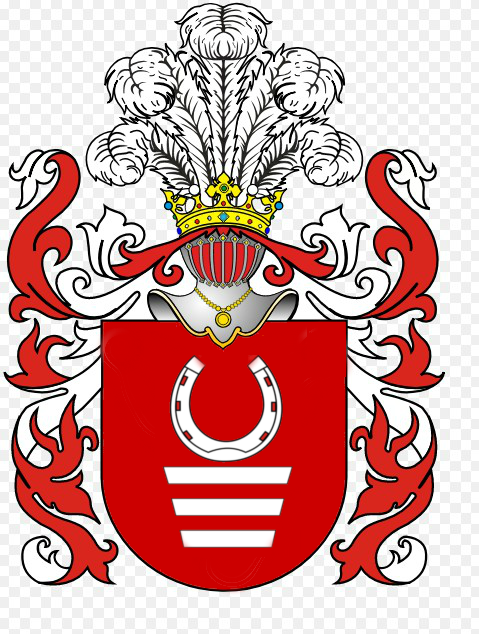
Krynicki, variant of Korzcak, 1589.

== See also ==
- List of Polish nobility coats of arms

== Bibliography ==
- Tadeusz Gajl: Herbarz polski od średniowiecza do XX wieku : ponad 4500 herbów szlacheckich 37 tysięcy nazwisk 55 tysięcy rodów. L&L, 2007. ISBN 978-83-60597-10-1.
