= Konstanty Branicki =

Polish landowner (1824–1884)

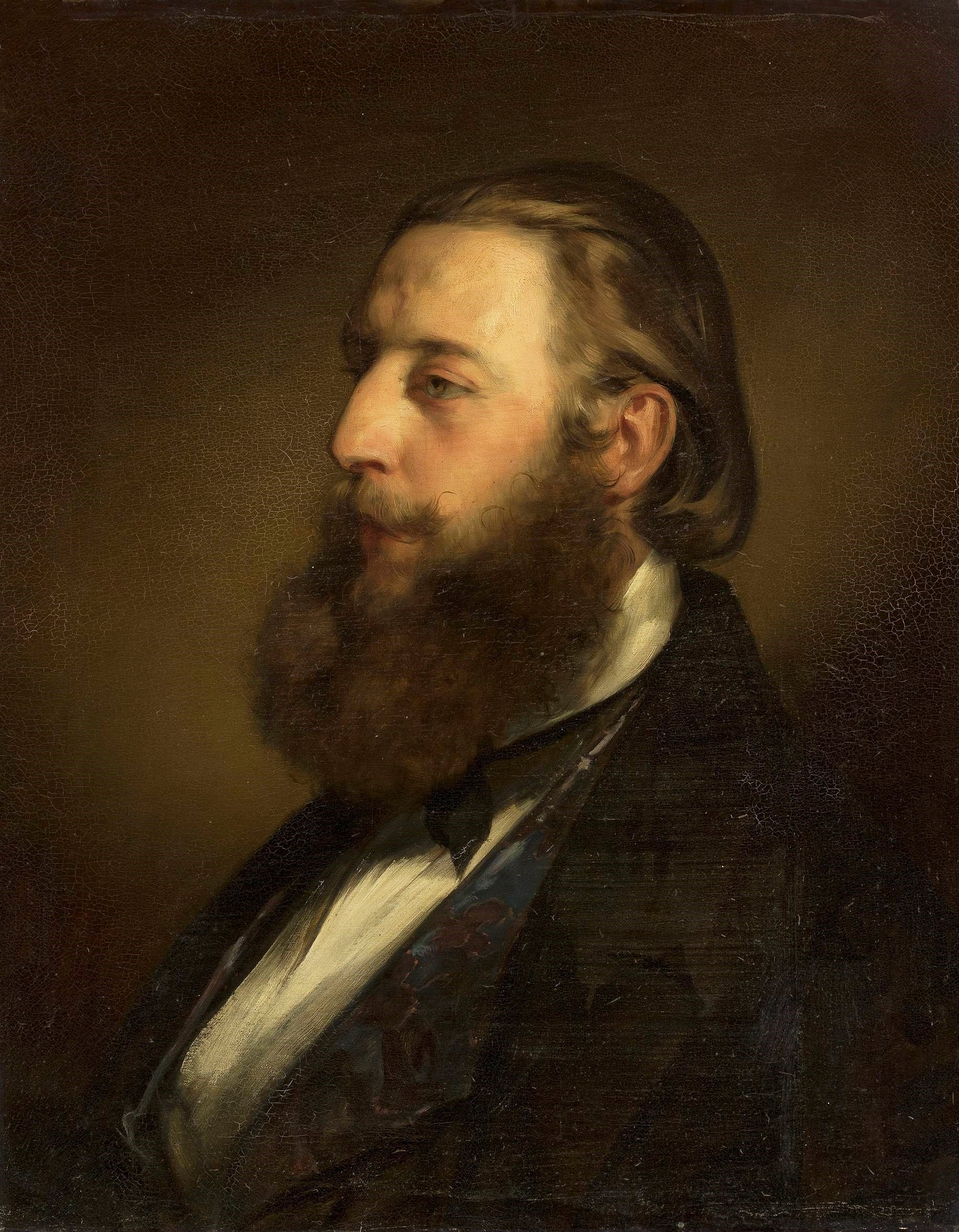
Portrait, c. 1852

Count Konstanty Grzegorz Branicki (9 May 1824 – 14 July 1884) was a Polish landowner, collector and naturalist who established a private museum of natural history in Warsaw. The bird species Heliodoxa branickii and Odontorchilus branickii described from his collections were named after him.

== Life and work ==
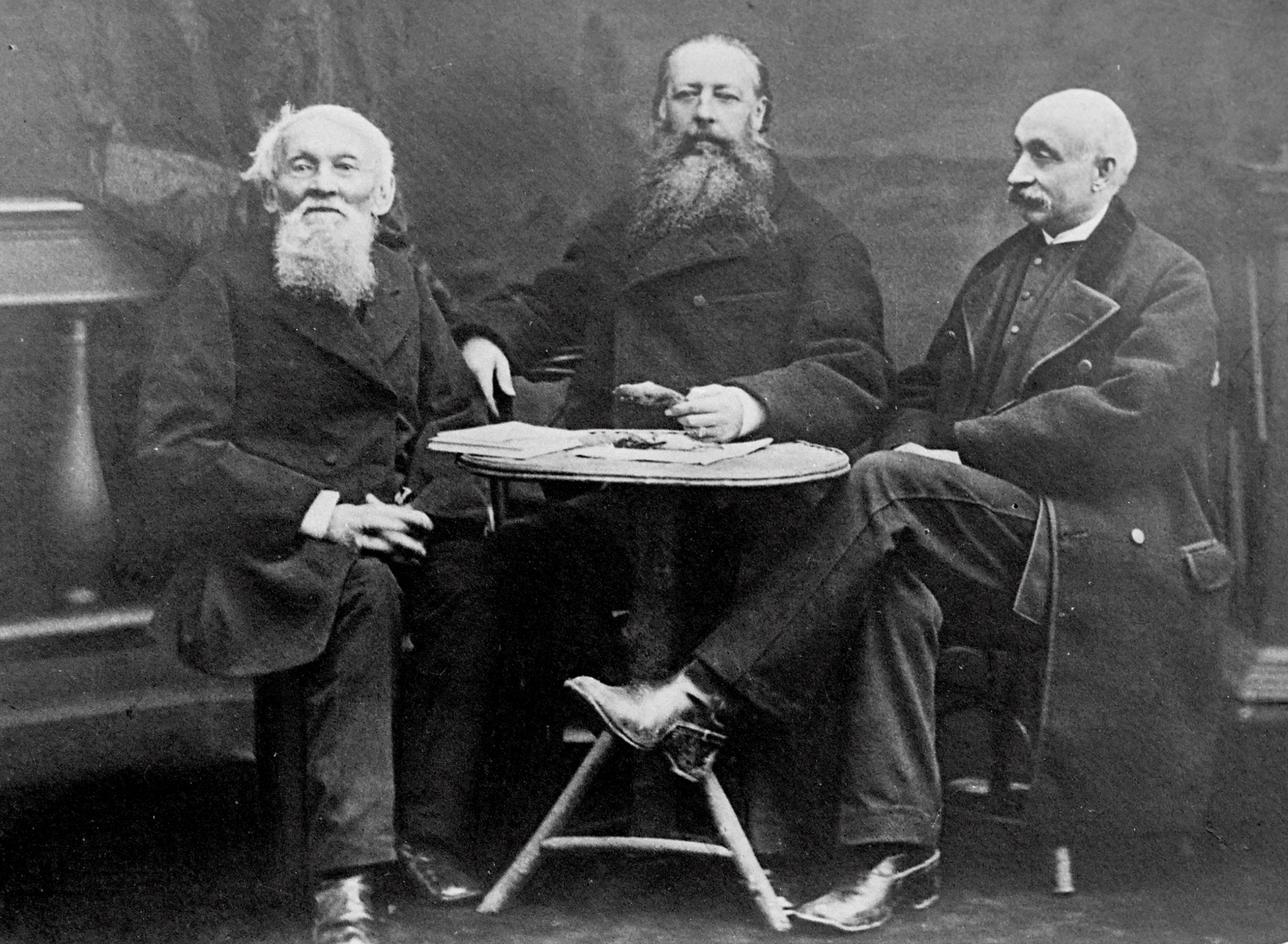
Waga, Branicki and Taczanowski

Branicki was born in Biała Cerkiew, the son of Władysław Michał Branicki (1783–1843) and Róża. He was born at time when Tsarist Russian intelligence watched over his family and considered them as potential enemies. Born with a heart condition, he took an interest in natural history and had a great love of travel. He then travelled with his brother Aleksander to Egypt and Nubia in 1863. Another trip was made in 1866 to Algeria with Władysław Taczanowski and Antoni Stanisław Waga. The two Branickis established a private zoological museum in 1887, financing expeditions into Ussuri 1883-1885, to Korea and Japan (1885-1887), and Peru (1881-1902). Later they paid for collectors including Benedykt Dybowski, Konstanty Jelski, Jan Sztolcman, and others. He took an interest in archaeology and undertook excavations around Mironowski; many of the findings are now in the Krakow archaeological museum. The Branicki museum was later managed by his son, Ksawery Branicki (1864–1926), in Warsaw. It became part of the state museum in 1919 and in 1928 became part of the State Zoological Museum.

Branicki was married to Jadwiga Potocka and they had a daughter Róża Maria Branicka and a son Ksawery (also given as Xavier) Branicki (1864–1926) who was also a naturalist and collector.
