= Krzeszowice =

Town in Lesser Poland Voivodeship, Poland

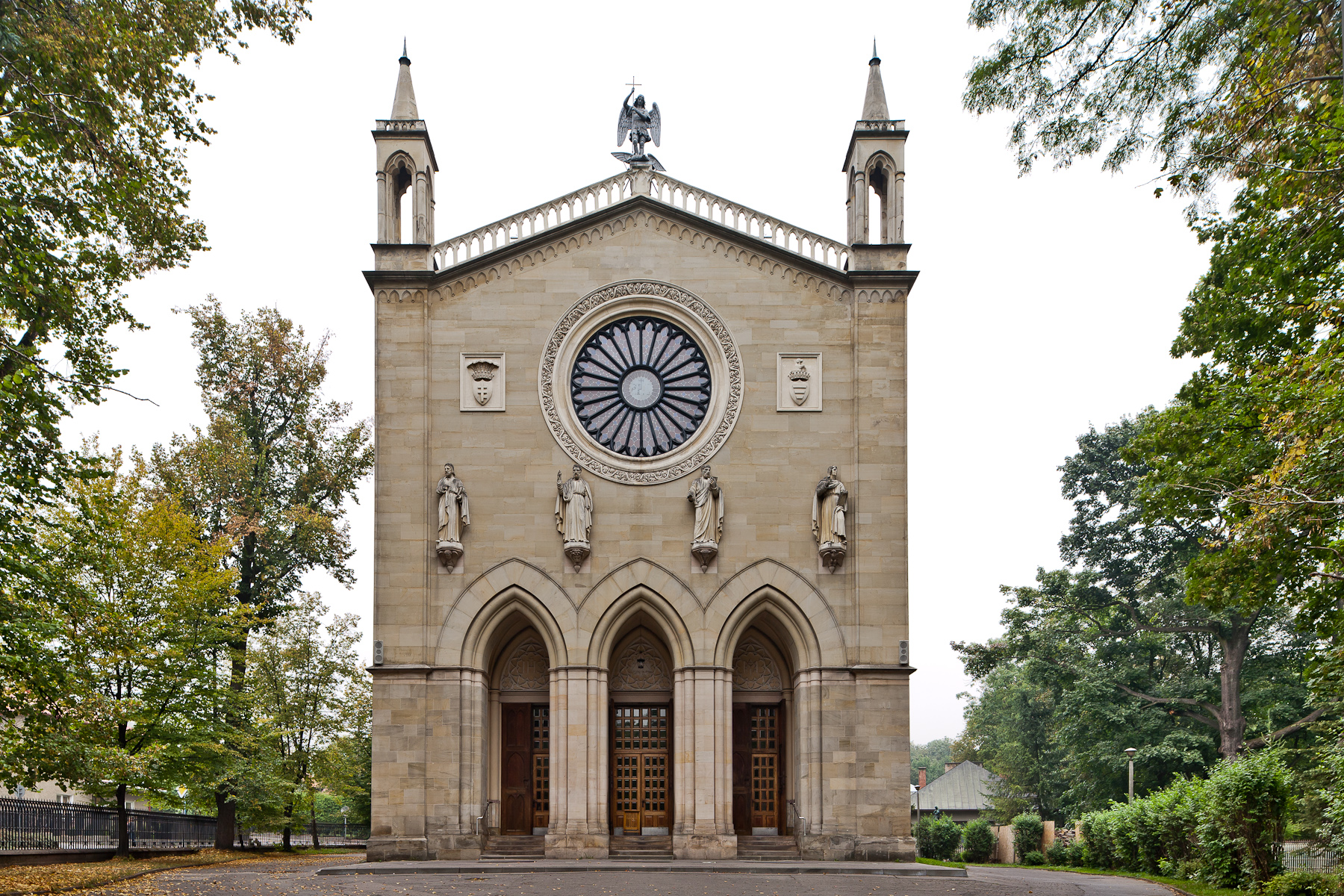
- St. Martin's Church

- Flag Coat of arms

- Location within Poland
- Coordinates: 50°8′N 19°38′E
- Country: Poland
- Voivodeship: Lesser Poland
- County: Kraków
- Gmina: Krzeszowice
- First mentioned: 1286

Government
  - Mayor: Wacław Gregorczyk

Area
  - Total: 16.84 km^{2} (6.50 sq mi)

Population (2006)
  - Total: 9,942
  - Density: 590.4/km^{2} (1,529/sq mi)
- Time zone: UTC+1 (CET)
  - Summer (DST): UTC+2 (CEST)
- Postal code: 32-065
- Car plates: KRA
- Website: http://www.krzeszowice.pl

Krzeszowice [kʂɛʂɔˈvʲit͡sɛ] is a town in southern Poland, situated in the Lesser Poland Voivodeship. As of 2004, its population was 9,993. Krzeszowice belongs to Kraków Metropolitan Area, and lies 25 kilometers west of the center of the city of Kraków. The town has a rail station, on a major route from Kraków to Katowice, and lies along National Road Nr. 79, which goes from Warsaw to Bytom. In 1928–1966 the town had the status of a spa. Krzeszowice has a sports club called Świt, founded in 1923.

Krzeszowice is located in southern part of the Kraków-Częstochowa Upland, with numerous caves and valleys in the area. In 1981, when the Complex of Jura Landscape Parks was created, three parks from the gmina of Krzeszowice were added to it (Rudnia Landscape Park, Tenczynek Landscape Park and Kraków Valleys Landscape Park). In 2008, it was selected with 19 villages of Europe - Germany, Poland, Italy and Spain - for the Spanish documentary film "Villages of Europe" Pueblos de Europa, produced by Juan Frutos.

== History ==
First mention of Krzeszowice comes from 1286, when Bishop of Kraków, Paweł z Przemankowa, allowed a man named Fryczek Freton to locate the village of Cressouicy. By 1337, Krzeszowice already had a wooden church of St. Martin. In the mid-15th century, it had a school and a public house. In 1555, Krzeszowice belonged to Stanisław Tęczynski, then it was owned by several noble families - the Sieniawski family, Opaliński family, Czartoryski family, Lubomirski family and, since 1816, the Potocki family.

In the early 17th century, the advantages of local mineral water were discovered by Krzeszowice parish priest, reverend Bernard Bocheński, who mentioned it in the 1625 parish records. In 1778, Prince August Czartoryski opened here first baths, and soon afterwards, patients began visiting Krzeszowice. In 1783–1786, the Vauxhall Palace was built, and in 1819, the Green Bath was opened. Krzeszowice began to prosper, in 1809–1815 and 1855–1867, the town was the seat of a county. In 1815–1846, Krzeszowice belonged to the Free City of Kraków, and to Austria in 1846-1918 within the Grand Duchy of Cracow, Chrzanow Bezirkshauptmannschaft.

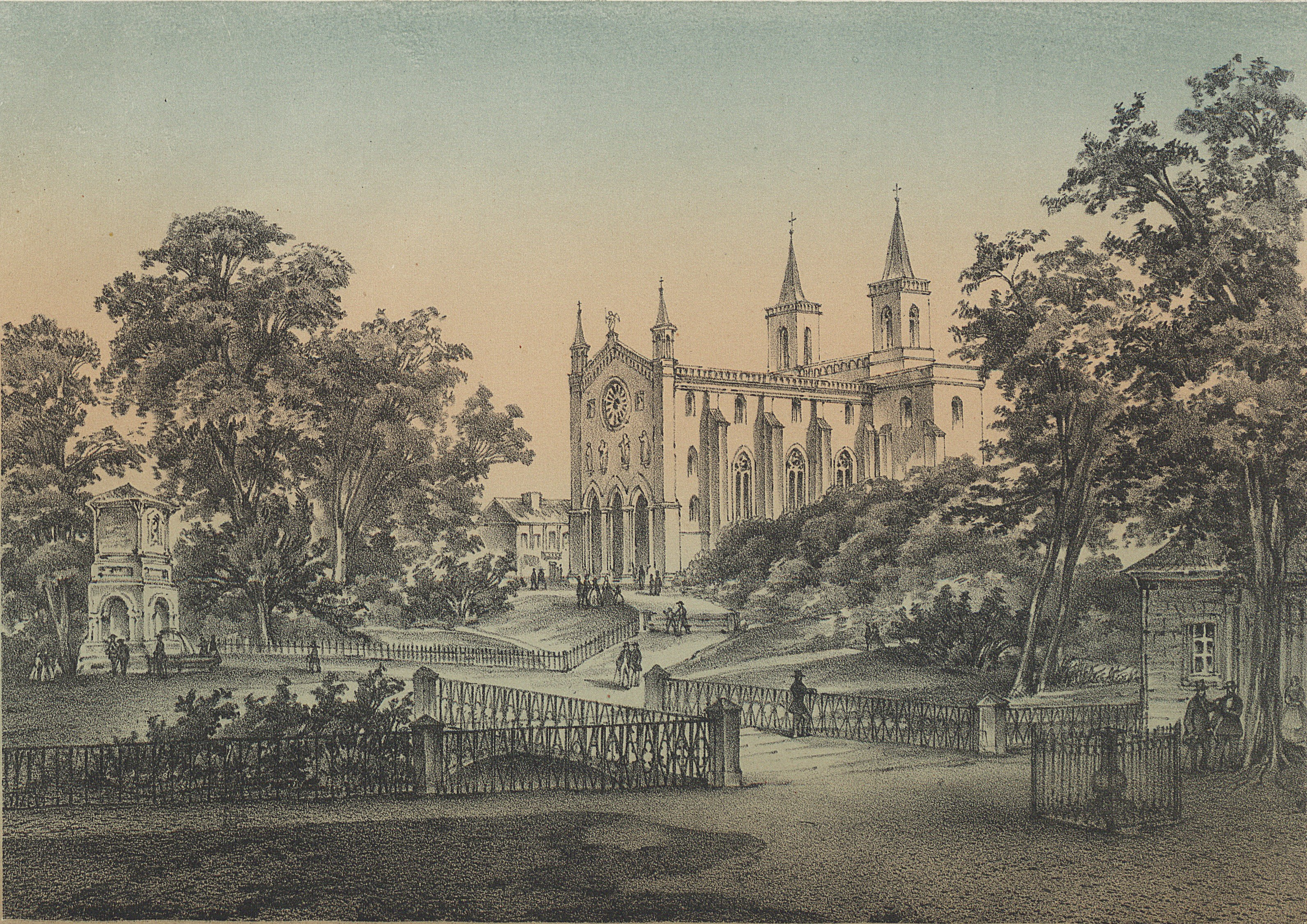
Krzeszowice in the 1860s

A hospital was opened here in 1829, a shelter for the poor in 1843, and in 1844, neo-Gothic church was built. In 1847 Krzeszowice received a rail station, along the newly built route from Kraków to Mysłowice. Local residents took part in the Kraków Uprising, and helped Polish rebels from Russian-controlled Congress Poland, during the January Uprising. In 1850–1855, the Potocki Palace was built, in the Italian Renaissance style, together with English garden. The palace with all its details was not completed until 1870.

By 1910, the population of Krzeszowice was 2619, out of which Jews made 18%. The town continued to develop, with several new enterprises opened here in the late 19th and early 20th century. On December 3, 1924, Krzeszowice was officially incorporated as a town. New districts and blocks of flats were built, and by 1931, the population grew to 3,391.

Following the German-Soviet invasion of Poland, which started World War II in September 1939, the town was occupied by Germany, and included with the General Government. The Potocki Palace was restored by Polish slave laborer by the order of Nazis and renamed by Germans into Haus Kressendorf, becoming the summer residence of Hans Frank. Almost all Jewish citizens were murdered in the Holocaust. The German occupation of Krzeszowice ended on 19 January 1945.

== Landmarks ==
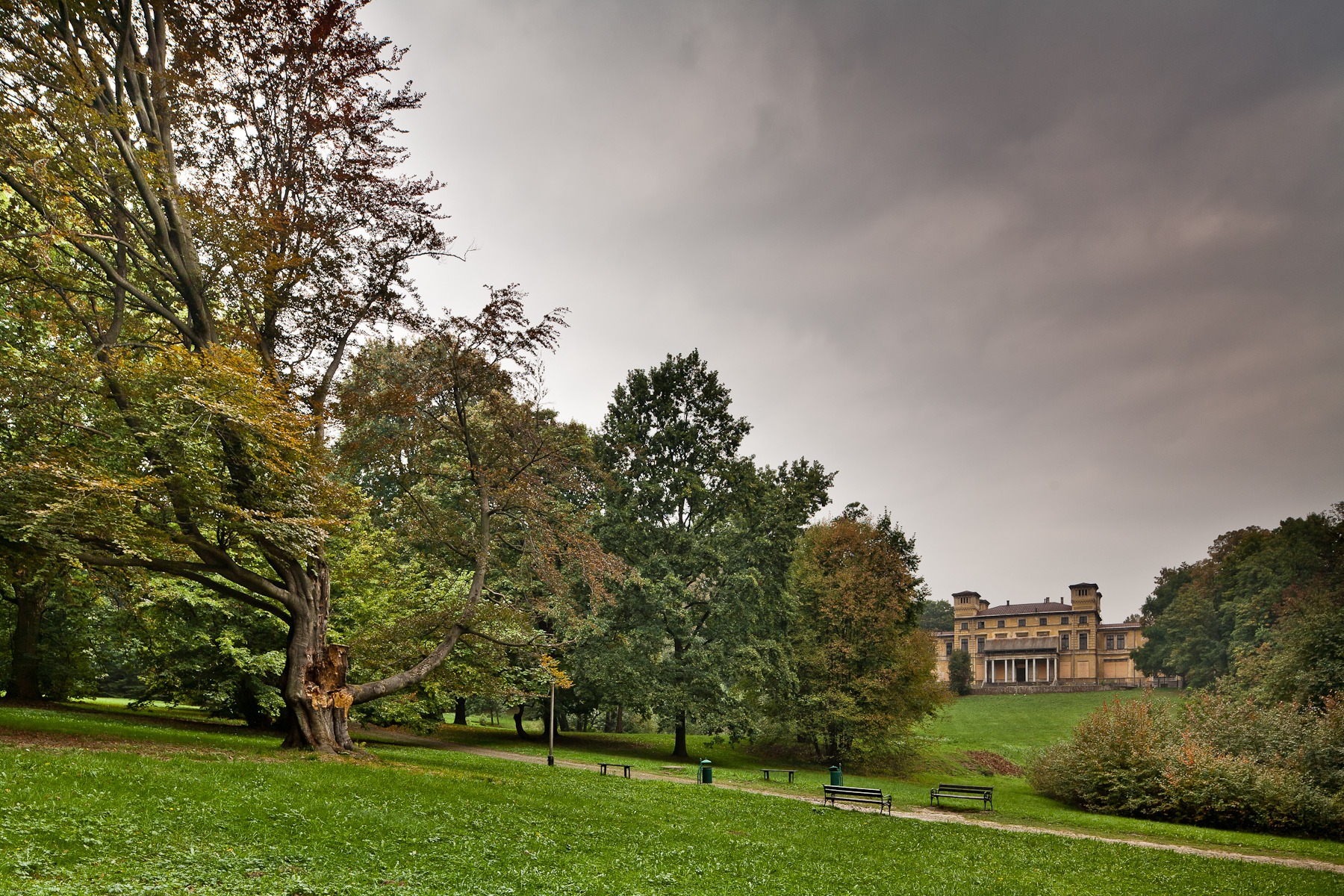
Potocki Palace and Park

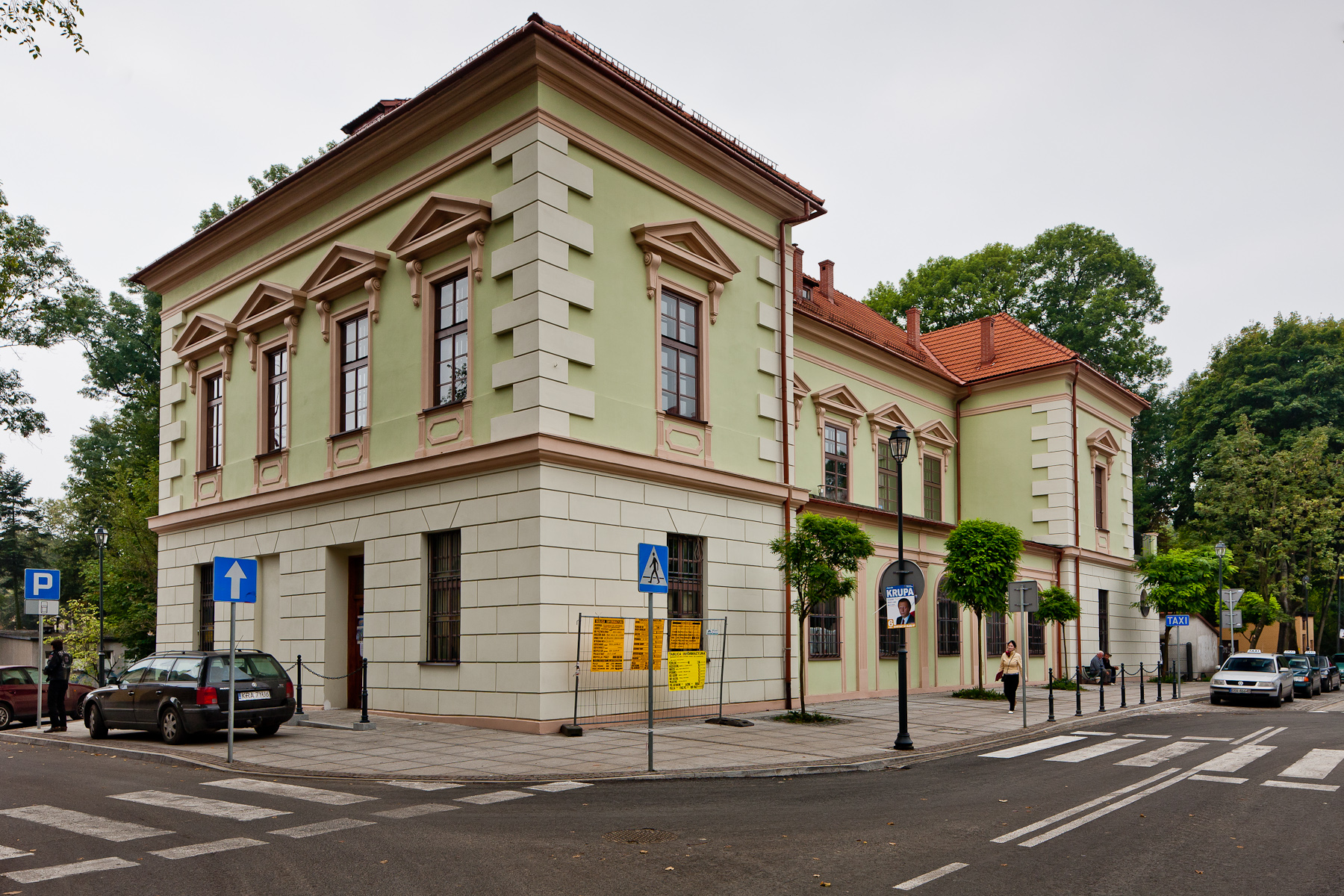
Vauxhall Palace

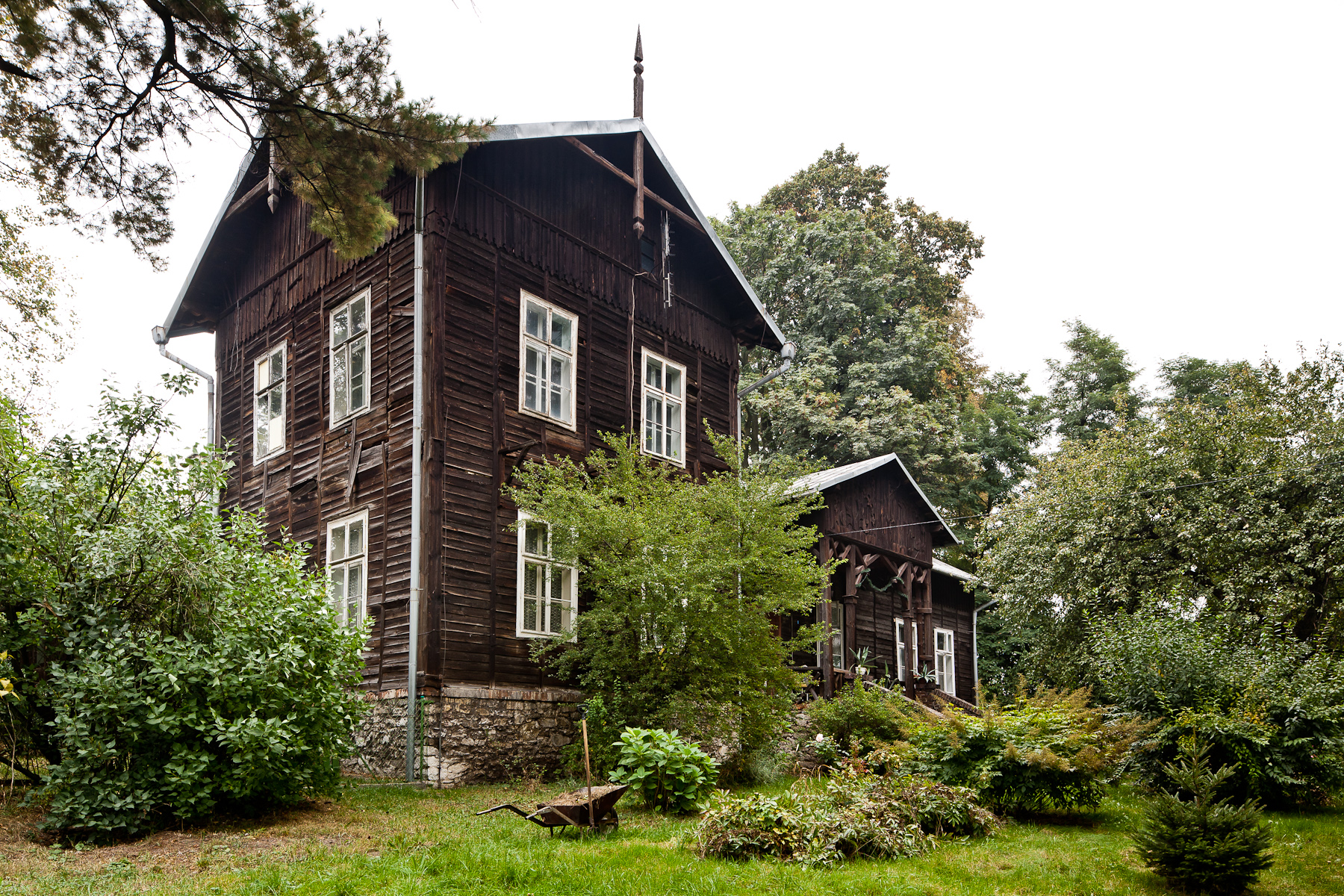
Forester lodge

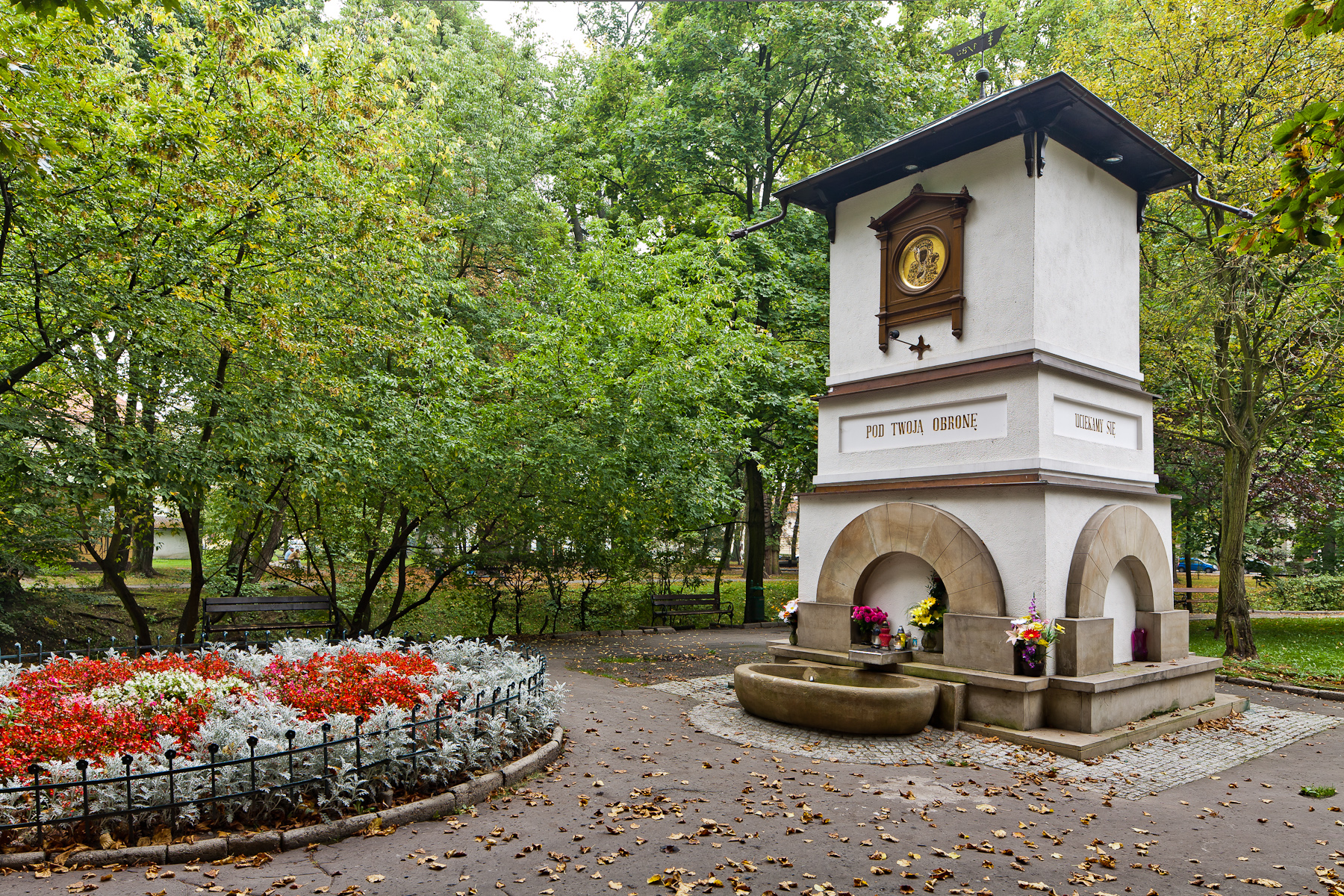
Zdrój chapel

=== Architecture ===
- St. Martin's Church in the Neo-Gothic style
- Potocki Palace
- Vauxhall Palace

=== Parks and gardens ===
- Potocki Gardens

=== Museums and galleries ===
- The Museum of Krzeszowice Land, a small art gallery with art, objects and furniture.

== Religion ==
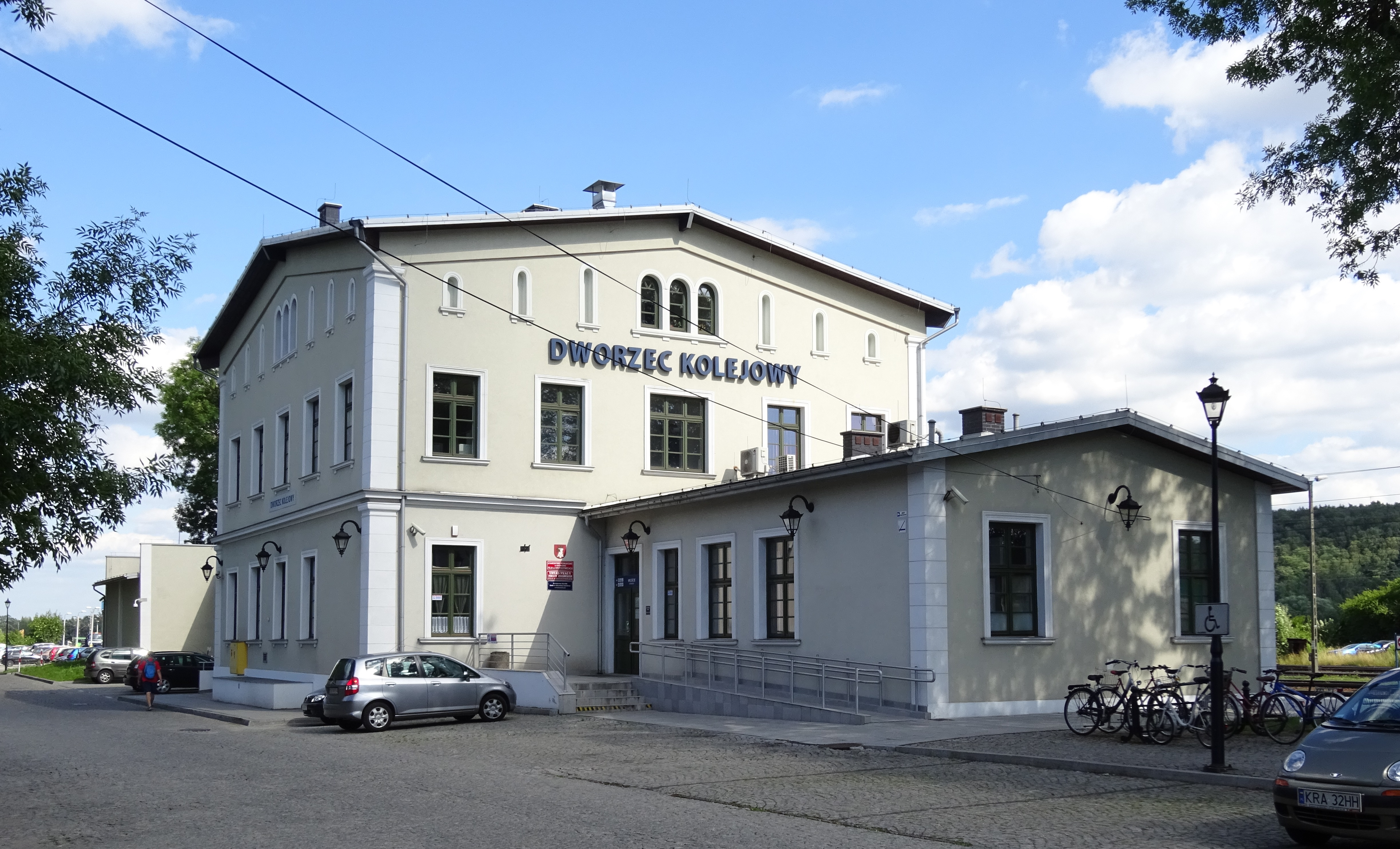
Krzeszowice railway station

- Roman Catholicism (The St. Martin's Church, Grunwaldzka Street 1; and The St. John Paul II Church, Żbicka Street 43)
- Jehovah's Witnesses (Congregation Krzeszowice, Kościuszki Street 49)
