= Marina Trattner =

Swedish lawyer, journalist of Ukrainian descent

- Марина Траттнер
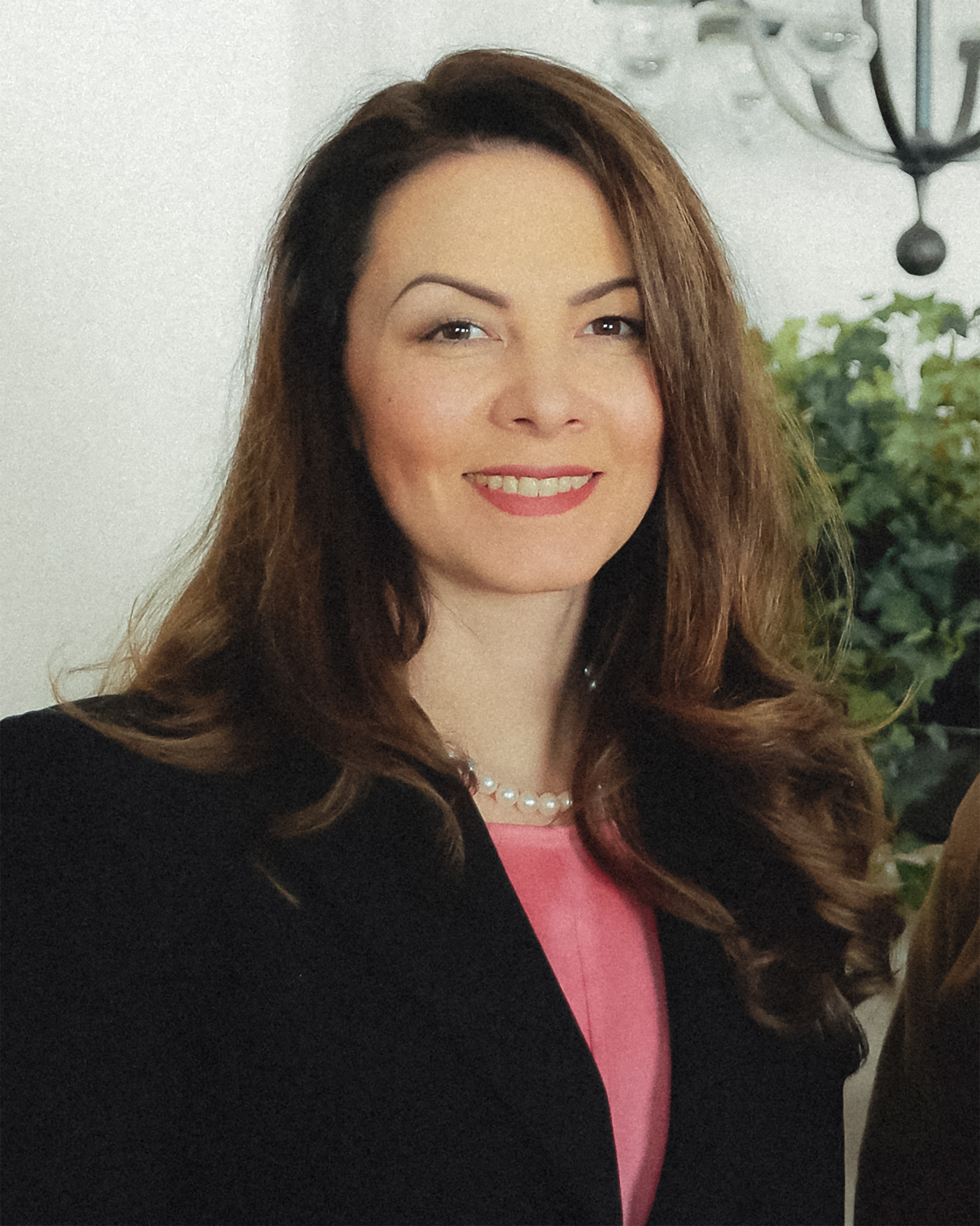
- Born: Bila Tserkva, Kyiv Oblast, Ukraine
- Education: Kyiv International Institute of Linguistics and Law, Lund University, University of Gothenburg
- Occupations: Lawyer, journalist, archivist, public figure, and popularizer of history
- Awards: Medal For Sacrifice and Love of Ukraine

Marina Trattner or Maryna Trattner (Ukrainian: Марина Траттнер; born in Bila Tserkva, Kyiv Oblast) is a Swedish lawyer and journalist of Ukrainian descent, an independent researcher, public figure, and popularizer of history. Renowned for her groundbreaking work in uncovering and publishing unique historical documents related to Ukraine’s Hetmanate era, she has made significant contributions to the field through her research in Swedish archives.

== Biography ==
Marina Trattner was born in Bila Tserkva, Ukraine. Her paternal ancestry traces back to the village of Vilshana (Romny Raion, Sumy Oblast). Her family's harrowing experiences during the Holodomor of 1932–1933, deeply influenced her professional journey, inspiring her to explore the historical ties between Ukraine and Sweden.

She earned her journalism degree from the International Institute of Linguistics and Law in Kyiv and later pursued a Master’s in European Business Law at Lund University in Sweden. Since 2005, she has resided in Sweden, where she collaborates with high-tech firms and specializes in analyzing natural resource utilization. Through her studies in Swedish law and paleography courses at the University of Gothenburg, Trattner mastered Old Swedish and Latin, enabling her to decipher and interpret primary sources spanning the period from the 1400s to the 1700s. She has assembled an international team of researchers proficient in 12 languages, dedicated to translating and analyzing these archival materials.

Marina Trattner conducts comprehensive research at the Swedish National Archives (Riksarkivet) and other European archives, where she specializes in deciphering historical shorthand and translating documents from the 15th to 18th centuries. Through her collaboration with the Swedish National Archive, she has identified over 30,000 pages of documents related to the history of Ukraine. This work culminated in the creation of a dedicated online resource focused on Ukraine’s political history.

Trattner is also a creative writer, crafting short stories in Swedish and poetry in Ukrainian.

=== Public activities ===
In 2021, Marina Trattner co-authored a popular science publication, Treasures of the Swedish Archives (Ukrainian: «Скарби шведських архівів»), in collaboration with Swedish and Ukrainian historians. The book features images of original documents, transcriptions in their original languages, and Ukrainian translations. In 2024, Ukrainian-Canadian translator Inga Kononenko translated it into English.

In September 2024, Marina Trattner unveiled a joint project with historians from Poltava to update the exhibition at the Museum of the History of the Battle of Poltava. The new display is built on digitized Swedish archival documents that refute Russian myths about Peter I's so-called "triumph". Instead, it exposes the true aftermath of the 1711 Battle of Prut, which ended in a decisive defeat for the Muscovite army. Trattner underscores the critical need to decolonize museum spaces and purge global history of Russian propaganda by incorporating previously inaccessible primary sources.

In 2025, Trattner joined the project Orlyk’s Residence. Rediscovering Ukraine in the Archives of the World (Ukrainian: «Резиденція Орлика: Віднайдення України в архівах світу»). This initiative was developed in partnership with the Ministry of Foreign Affairs of Ukraine, experts from the National Historical and Cultural Reserve "Hetman's Capital" (Baturyn), and Ukrainian and European scholars.

Under the direction of Trattner’s research team, over 600 pages of archival documents previously unused in Ukrainian academic research were translated and analyzed. This work uncovered a sophisticated international network established during the era of Hetman Ivan Mazepa. The network’s mission was to liberate Ukrainian lands from the control of the Moscow Tsardom and forge a collective security framework in Europe. Drawing on these findings, Not Habsburgs production company used AI-driven technologies to create the documentary film INCOGNITO: A Secret Network to Save Ukraine and Defend Europe (Ukrainian: «INCOGNITO – таємна мережа для порятунку України і захисту Європи»). The film sheds light on the pivotal role of Ukrainian diplomacy and intelligence in early 18th-century Europe.

Trattner also collaborates with the non-governmental organization Repower, supporting psychological rehabilitation programs for Ukrainian military doctors and medics. As of 2026, this partnership has successfully implemented 19 projects across Sweden, Denmark, and Spain.

== Key works and discoveries ==
Marina Trattner's research has yielded a series of discoveries, significantly enriching the global understanding of Ukraine’s historical agency.

On 15 December 2025, the National Kyiv-Pechersk Historical and Cultural Preserve launched the international exhibition The Kyiv Principality of the 14th–15th Centuries: Ukraine’s Impact on European Security (Ukrainian: «Київське князівство XIV-XV століть: український фактор у безпеці Європи»). Curated by Marina Trattner and led by scientific director Dr. Oleh Odnorozhenko, the project was developed under the patronage of the Orthodox Church of Ukraine and in partnership with the Ministry of Foreign Affairs of Ukraine, the Sheremetiev Museum in Kyiv, and researchers from Sweden, Ukraine, and Lithuania. The exhibition underscores the Kyiv’s pivotal role as a strategic center of European security after 1240, tracing the principality’s transformation into a voivodeship. Showcasing artifacts—from acts of the Patriarchate of Constantinople to medieval weaponry—the exhibition challenges imperial narratives of a "shared heritage" and instead affirms the continuity of Ukrainian statehood and ecclesiastical traditions. This exhibition is the first comprehensive effort to document the legacy of the Olelkovych princely dynasty and to chronicle the struggle to restore the independent Kyiv Metropolis. It also explores the history of Orthodox centers in Crimea under the jurisdiction of Constantinople and the role of regiments from Ukrainian lands in pivotal European battles of the 14th–15th centuries. The exhibition’s scientific framework dismantles the myth of Moscow's historical dominance in the region, instead highlighting Kyiv’s enduring state and religious sovereignty.

Among Trattner’s most notable achievements is her analysis of the Swedish Riksdag protocols, where she uncovered the earliest documented evidence of Bohdan Khmelnytsky's initiative to establish Ukraine’s independent monetary system through coin minting. This finding provides compelling evidence of the economic autonomy of the Ukrainian state during that era.

In the realm of diplomatic history, Marina Trattner introduced a landmark 1711 document into scholarly discourse: a letter from King Charles XII of Sweden to his envoy Thomas Funck, recognizing Ukraine as an independent state. Discovered by archivist Jan Mispelaere at Trattner’s request, this letter was presented as a facsimile by Swedish Prime Minister Magdalena Andersson to Ukrainian President Volodymyr Zelenskyy during her visit to Ukraine. The document explicitly refers to Ukraine as an independent state and validates legitimacy of Pylyp Orlyk as its leader. Her research on the 1711 Prut campaign further debunked established myths, revealing the publicly documented fact of Peter I's capitulation and his forced commitments to de-occupy Ukrainian and Polish territories, restore Cossack liberties, and resume tribute payments to the Crimean Khan.

Trattner also illuminated early 20th-century history by publishing Swedish Ministry of Foreign Affairs reports (1918–1921), which provide objective firsthand European diplomatic accounts of Bolshevik repression in Ukraine including systemic looting and engineered famine.

On November 25, 2025, she moderated a Crimea Platform panel discussion in Stockholm, European Unity against Russian Imperial Revanchism: From the Alliances of the 17th–18th Centuries to Shared Responsibility in the 21st Century (Ukrainian: «Європейська єдність проти російського імперського реваншу: від союзів XVII–XVIII століть до спільної відповідальності у ХХІ столітті»). Organized by the Mejlis of the Crimean Tatar People and the Embassy of Ukraine in Sweden, the event featured an exhibition of archival documents (1592–1738) from the collections of the Swedish State Archives and the Ottoman Archives, showcasing historical cooperation among Sweden, Ukraine, Crimea, and Turkey in regional security. The visual presentation included reproductions of paintings by Yuriy Khymych, celebrating the architectural heritage of Crimea.

Marina Trattner has made systemic contribution to archival innovation including the initiative to modernize Sweden's search databases. She introduced a dedicated “Ukraine” tag, making it easier to identify and access Ukrainian national historical records within foreign archives. Additionally, she is developing a virtual map of Ukrainian heritage, enhancing the visibility and study of Ukraine’s historical legacy.

To analyze sources in 12 languages, Trattner assembled an international team including Jan Mispelaere, Karin Borgkvist Ljung, Oleksandr Alfiorov, Ihor Poluektov, Oleksii Kresin, Oleksandr Malyshev, Borys Cherkas, Oleh Odnorozhenko, Oleksii Sheremetiev, Oleksii Chekal, Stanislav Parkhomenko, Valentyna Bochkovska, Yurii Mytsyk, Yevhen Chernukhin, Gulnara Abdulayeva, Dmytro Rudiuk, Natalia Drobiazko, Tetiana Kerbut, Maryna Harmak, Dmytro Wyrskyj, Andrii Grechylo, Serhii Pavlenko, Yevhen Luniak, Viktor Moisiienko, Inga Kononenko and other scholars.

== Recognition ==
On 23 April 2024, Marina Trattner was received by Metropolitan Epiphanius of Kyiv and All Ukraine at the Metropolitan’s House (Saint Sophia Cathedral complex, Kyiv, Ukraine). Their discussion focused on her research in Swedish archives, particularly her work uncovering historical documents related to Ukraine. In recognition of her significant contributions to Ukrainian history and cultural education, Metropolitan Epiphanius awarded Marina Trattner Medal For Sacrifice and Love of Ukraine.
