= Great Synagogue (Bila Tserkva) =

Former synagogue in Bila Tserkva, Ukraine

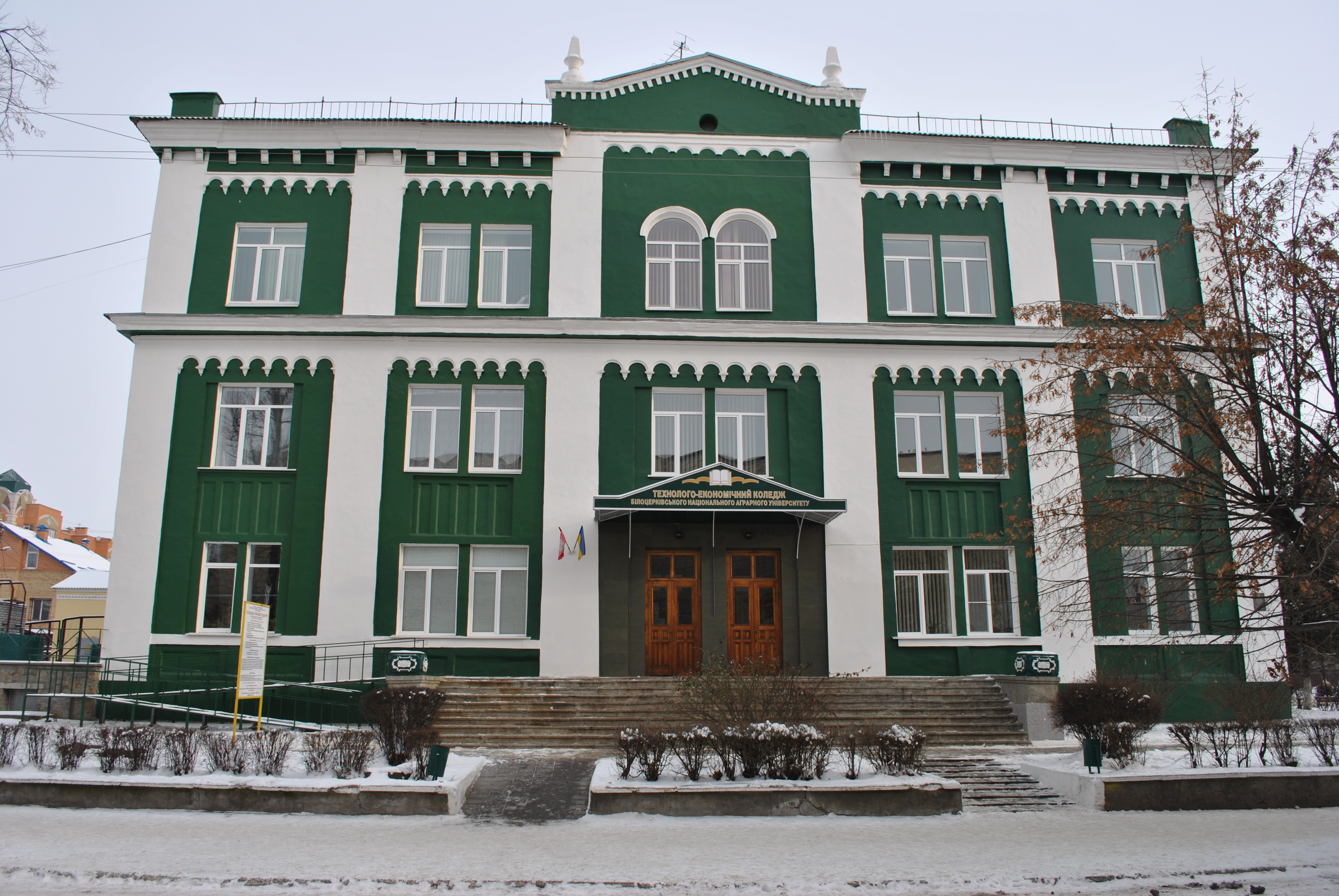
- The former synagogue, now college, in 2012

- Location of the former synagogue in Ukraine

Religion
- Affiliation: Orthodox Judaism (former)
- Rite: Nusach Ashkenaz
- Ecclesiastical or organizational status: Synagogue (1860–c. 1930s); University college (since c. 1950s)
- Status: Abandoned (as a synagogue); Repurposed (as a college)

Location
- Location: Yaroslava Mudroho Street, Bila Tserkva, Kyiv Oblast
- Country: Ukraine
- Interactive map of Great Synagogue
- Coordinates: 49°47′51″N 30°07′08″E

Architecture
- Architect: Volman
- Funded by: Count Viadislav-Mikail Branitsky
- Completed: 1860

Specifications
- Length: 25.39 metres (83.3 ft)
- Width: 25.05 metres (82.2 ft)
- Height (max): 17.5 metres (57 ft)
- Materials: Bricks (170,000)

Immovable Monument of Local Significance of Ukraine
- Official name: Синагога (Synagogue)
- Type: Architecture
- Reference no.: 40-Ко

The Great Synagogue or Choral Synagogue is a former Orthodox Jewish synagogue, located on Yaroslava Mudroho Street, in Bila Tserkva, Kyiv Oblast, Ukraine. The synagogue was built in the former Russian Empire in 1860 and the congregation worshipped in the Ashkenazi rite.

The building has been used as a college since the 1950s. In 2019 it was announced that the synagogue will be returned to the local Jewish community.

== History ==
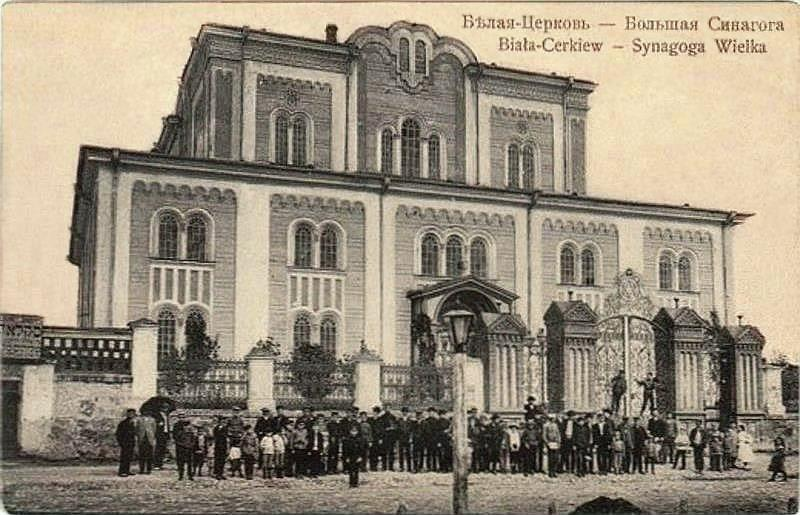
Between 1895 and 1910

The Great Synagogue (also known as the Choral Synagogue) was built in the years 1854 to 1860. In 1905 the synagogue was renovated and a new Holy Ark was built. Inside the building there were also several small shops, which were rented out.

In the 1920s or 1930s, the synagogue was closed by the Soviet authorities. After World War II a college was placed in the building. For this purpose additional walls were built inside.

== Architecture ==
The building is nearly square with outer measurements of 25.39 by 25.05 metres (83.3 ft × 82.2 ft). The height to the finishing cornice is 14.91 metres (48.9 ft) and to the rooftop 17.5 metres (57 ft). It has three tiers, whereby the lower two tiers are separated from the upper tier by a molded cornice. The front facade shows six pilaster; the pilasters and the cornice are painted white with the main walls are painted in green.

Old photos show that once the third storey, although square as well, had a much smaller plan. The outer walls were therefore not continuous, but had an offset between the second and third storey; that took place in an unknown period.

Despite the alterations the original plan of the synagogue has been preserved. In what was initially the prayer hall, there are four round supporting pillars that continue through each tier. The former prayer hall is surrounded by synagogue rooms which were used as the women's prayer rooms.

Neither the Torah ark nor the Bema are left.

== Other synagogues in Bila Tserkva ==
At least three more buildings that once were synagogues are preserved in the town. Their condition is not as good as the condition of the Great Synagogue.

== See also ==
- History of the Jews in Ukraine
- List of synagogues in Ukraine
- Bila Tserkva massacre
