= Oleh Serafyn =

Ukrainian singer

- Олег Серафин
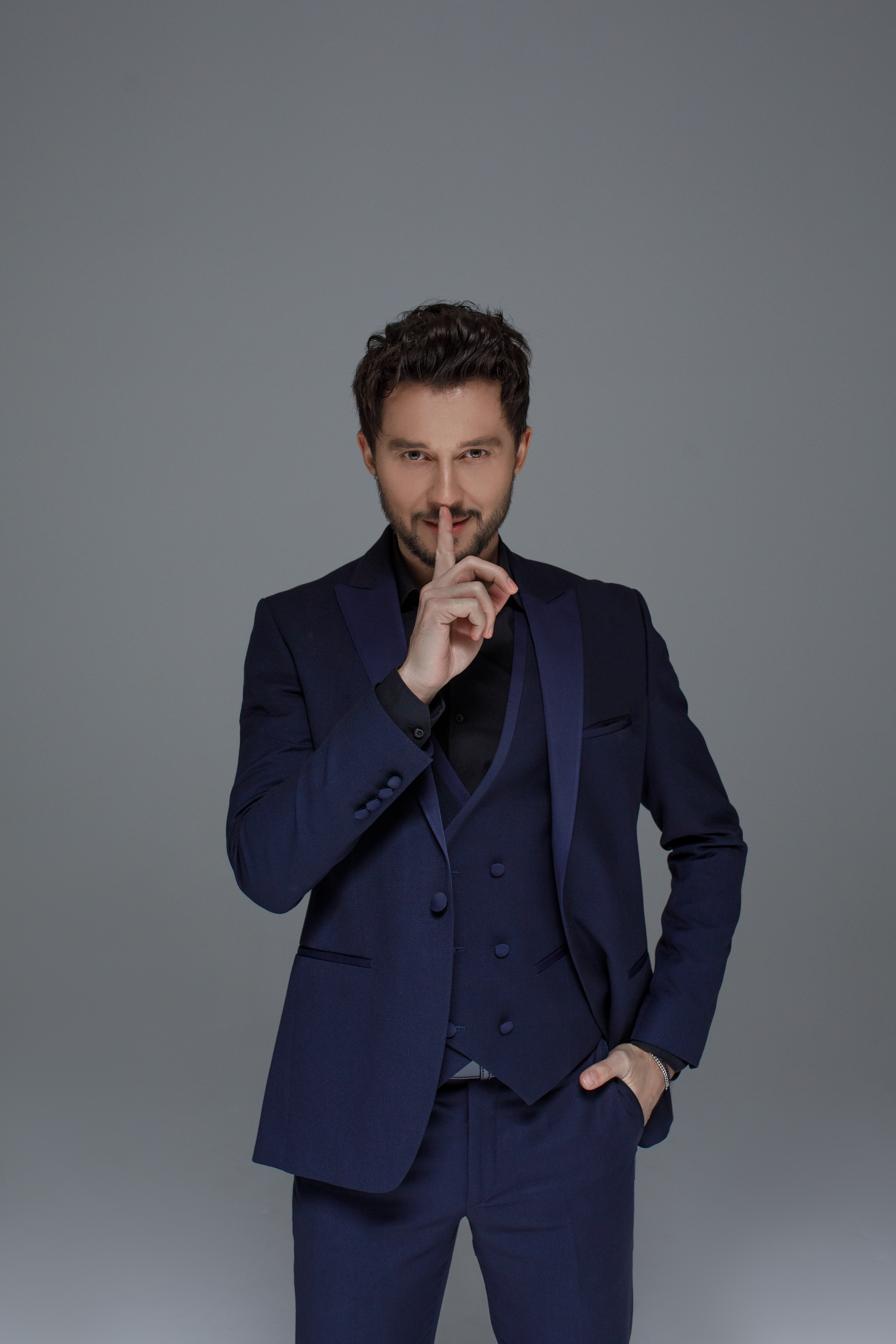
- Oleg in 2021
- Born: 11 April 1988 (age 38); Zhydachiv, Lviv Oblast, Ukrainian SSR, Soviet Union
- Citizenship: Ukraine
- Education: Kyiv International University
- Occupation: International Relations

Oleh Romanovych Serafyn (Ukrainian: Олег Романович Серафин; born 11 April 1988), known professionally as Serafyn is a Ukrainian singer, composer, choreographer and sound producer.

== Biography ==
Oleg was born on April 11, 1988, in Zhydachiv, Lviv oblast. He received his secondary education in Zhydachiv gymnasium named after O. Partytskyi. Since early childhood he wrote lyrics, original songs and lyrical compositions on the piano. He studied vocals and choreography at the Zhydachiv Children's Center for Children and Youth. In 2003 he graduated with honors from Zhydachiv Music School.

In 2005 he moved to Kyiv and enrolled in the Kyiv International University, Faculty of International Relations.

In 2006 together with Amador Lopez created the music band Rumbero's. Oleg is the author of all lyrics and music for the band. As a member of the Rumbero's band in May 2018 he opened the "League of Stars"; also together with the team he helpedKateryna Osadcha in staging numbers for the show "Premiere Night" in 2018, repeatedly performed as part of the band at Atlas Weekend.

He started his solo career in 2020.

In March 2022, during the Russian invasion of Ukraine, Serafyn moved to western Ukraine and began volunteering: collects and delivers humanitarian aid for internally displaced persons, delivers medicines to soldiers on the front line. He actively supports children, is engaged in their psychological rehabilitation through music and dance.

== Career ==
Serafyn's solo project was created during the quarantine. In the spring of 2020, after returning from France, the artist went into self-isolation. At this time, he wrote the song Karantyn, the video for which was taken into rotation by Ukrainian music TV channels.

In the fall of 2020, Oleg, together with the Ukrainian singer and new Lux FM presenter TANYA LI, became the face of the Lux FM radio promo.

In 2021, Serafyn began to prepare for release the original songs that he had accumulated over the previous pandemic year.

In April 2022, the artist wrote the song "Ukraine Above All" for which he filmed a video with a children's art center where he volunteered.

Together with the team, the artist organizes and joins charity concerts in Ukraine and Europe to raise funds for the Armed Forces of Ukraine.

On May 7, 2022, at a charity concert in Lutsk, the artist premiered a cover version of the Ukrainian folk song "Oh in the grove at the Danube". On July 7, the artist presented a video work for this song called "Nightingale".

== Television Programms ==
2020 – Presenter of the program "HitTok" on MUSIC BOX UA and presenter of the "Battles of Physical jerks" in "Breakfast with 1+1".

== Personal life ==
As of July 2022, the singer is single, but he has been repeatedly spotted with Dzidzio's ex-wife Slavia.
