= Biopharma LLC =

Ukrainian pharmaceutical company

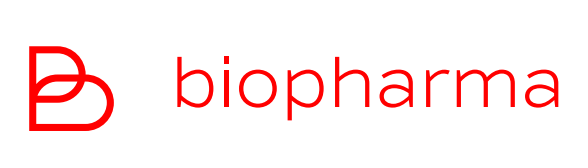
- Type: Private
- Industry: Pharmaceutical
- Founded: 1896 in Kyiv
- Headquarters: Kyiv, Ukraine
- Area served: Worldwide
- Key people: Kostyantyn Efymenko
- Products: medication
- Number of employees: 500
- Website: www.biopharma.ua

Biopharma (Ukrainian: ТОВ «Біофарма плазма») is the Ukrainian pharmaceutical company focused on the development and production of drugs based on human plasma.

== History ==
=== Foundation and early history ===
In 1895, the Association for the Control of Infectious Diseases was created, and in 1896 the Bacteriological Institute was founded in Kyiv. In 1897, a shelter for vaccination of the population was opened opposite the building.

=== 20th century ===
In 1920, with the opening of epidemiological, microbiological, parasitological and sanitary-hygienic departments, it was renamed to the "Sanitary and Bacteriological Institute."

In 1938, the Institute was divided into two parts: scientific and manufacturing. It was renamed to the "Ukrainian Institute of Epidemiology and Microbiology." At this time, the staff consisted of 250 employees.

During World War II, the Institute was evacuated to Kuybyshev and continued the research.

After the war, manufacturing returned to Kyiv. In 1955, the manufacturing expanded to 12 bacterial drugs. The institute begins to export to Europe, the Middle East, and India.

=== 21st century ===
In 2005, the company implemented the technology of the virus inactivation by the solvent/detergent method in the production of immunoglobulins.

In 2005, at the International Forum of Quality, the enterprise received the ISO 9001 certificate.

In 2009, after a series of changes, reorganizations, and renamings (in 1965, 1978, 1992), PrJSC Biopharma was formed.

In 2012, Horizon Capital and FMO invested in Biopharma for building a new biopharmaceutical production factory equipped with a quality control laboratory.

In 2014, the first phase of the Biopharmaceutical Research and Manufacturing Complex was launched in Bila Tserkva. It includes a pharmaceutical plant for the production of medicines, center for research, development and technology, laboratory building for quality control of drugs, warehouses for raw materials and finished products, housing for power systems.

The official opening of the Biopharmaceutical NSC "Biopharma" took place on June 16, 2015. On this occasion, the company handed over medicines worth ₴1 million, for the needs of the Ministry of Defense and the treatment of military personnel.

In September 2018 company joined The European Business Association (EBA).

2019 (September 19–20) Biopharma jointly with the Ministry of Health of Ukraine held an international forum on blood components and preparations - "Actual issues of industrial production of blood products". Within the framework of the forum, the official opening ceremony of the plasma fractionation plant was held, which became the first such plant in Ukraine and can process up to one million liters of plasma per year.

=== Construction of a new complex ===
At the end of 2016, Biopharma started the third stage of the construction – the plant for blood plasma fractionation. In October 2017, after the construction of a new building, the installation of technical equipment was started. At the new facilities, the company will produce Albumin, Bioven, and Immunoglobulin that help treat diseases caused by immunodeficiency.

The opening of the new complex took place in summer 2018 Vasyl Khmelnytsky and his partners invested $42 million in the research and production facility.

2019 — opening and launch of the first plasma fractionation plant in Ukraine which became the first such plant in Ukraine that can process up to one million liters of plasma per year. This technology enables to extract lifesaving drugs, requires advanced research and development, GMP-certified equipment and facilities. $75 million was raised to build the plant.

In December 2019, Biopharma sold part of the company to the German pharmaceutical manufacturer STADA. This decision was made because STADA will be able to bring investment and new expertise in the production and promotion of medicines. Biopharma's shareholders maintained the production of donor plasma drugs and focused on its development both in Ukraine and abroad.

Currently, the company is focused on combating the COVID-19 pandemic and is working in two main areas:

- Clinical trials of one of the main classic products - the drug Bioven, which is used in the complex treatment of complex bacterial and viral pneumonias. Potentially, it can also be used for pneumonia caused by COVID-19.
- The second direction is the development of hyperimmune immunoglobulin from the plasma of those who became ill with coronavirus. Scientists from different countries are inclined to believe that this drug can potentially be effective for the targeted treatment of patients with COVID-19. To do this, Biopharma joined the CoVIg-19 Plasma Alliance, which includes 10 world leaders in the production of plasma preparations.

== Social activities ==
Biopharma is involved in solving the problem of hemophilia and combating the AIDS epidemic and hepatitis C in Ukraine.

In 2017, as part of a public-private partnership, Biopharma invested over $3.5 million in the reconstruction and modernization of the Sumy Regional Blood Service Center. It is the first blood center in Ukraine certified according to the international standard ISO 9001: 2015.

In 2017, Biopharma launched an all-Ukrainian social program We do care. We are together, aimed at improving the quality of life of patients with hemophilia in Ukraine. In the same year, the company provided charitable assistance to medical institutions of Kyiv Oblast in the amount of ₴1 million. The company also intends to build 10 modern donor plasma collection centers throughout Ukraine.

In March 2018, Biopharma initiated public discussions and held a series of meetings with representatives of the All-Ukrainian Hemophilia Society, the World Hemophilia Federation, and the Children with Hemophilia Charitable Foundation. As a result, a Memorandum of Cooperation was concluded and signed, which makes it possible to implement a system of public control over the production of the drug for patients with hemophilia "BioClot A".

At the end of July 2020, the first Biopharma Plasma center was opened in Cherkasy. The company leased the obsolete regional blood center and turned it into a high-tech progressive European institution. They installed modern equipment and created the most comfortable conditions for both donors and employees.

== Activities during the COVID-19 pandemic ==
At the end of March 2020, Biopharma helped the laboratory of the Center for Public Health of Ukraine of the Ministry of Healthcare to establish a national reference laboratory for the detection of coronavirus. In March 2020, the laboratory has already analyzed hundreds of samples and thus became a flagship in the fight against the spread of coronavirus in Ukraine.

In April 2020, Biopharma started collecting plasma from people who had recovered from COVID-19. Free tests for the presence of antibodies to coronavirus are conducted for all donors. Plasma is collected from donors by hardware plasmapheresis.

In September 2020 Biopharma has completed clinical trials of immunoglobulin (Bioven) in the complex therapy of patients with pneumonia caused by coronavirus infection COVID-19.
