= Kyiv University (disambiguation) =

Kyiv University usually refers to the historic university founded in Kiev in 1834 whose current full name is the National Taras Shevchenko University of Kyiv.

Many other institutions of higher education in Kiev are currently called Universities while they have been mostly known under their historic names.

- National University of Kyiv-Mohyla Academy
- National Technical University of Ukraine Kyiv Polytechnic Institute
- Kyiv National Economic University
- Kyiv National University of Construction and Architecture
- Kyiv International University
- Borys Grinchenko Kyiv University
- Kyiv National University of Trade and Economics
