= Shaye (name) =

Shaye is a given name and surname.

== Given name ==
- Shaye Al-Nafisah (1962–2023), Saudi Arabian footballer
- Shaye Anderson (born 1975), Canadian politician
- Shaye Boddington (born 1986), New Zealand diver
- Shaye Cogan (1923 - 2009), American actress
- Shaye J. D. Cohen (born 1948), American rabbi and historian
- Shaye Lynne Haver (born 1990), US Army Ranger School graduate
- Shaye de Paiva (born 2000), Canadian rower
- Shaye Scott, American social media personality
- Shaye Sharahili (born 1990), Saudi Arabian footballer
- Shaye Shkarovsky (1891–1945), Ukrainian Yiddish author
- Keely Shaye Smith (born 1963), American TV journalist

== Surname ==
- Abdulelah Haider Shaye (born c. 1977), Yemeni journalist
- Lin Shaye (born 1943), American actress
- Lu Shaye (born 1964), Chinese diplomat
- Robert Shaye (born 1939), American actor and film director
- Skyler Shaye (born 1986), American actress

== See also ==
- Shaye (disambiguation)
