= Kostiantyn Yefymenko =

Ukrainian businessman and politician

- Костянтин Єфименко
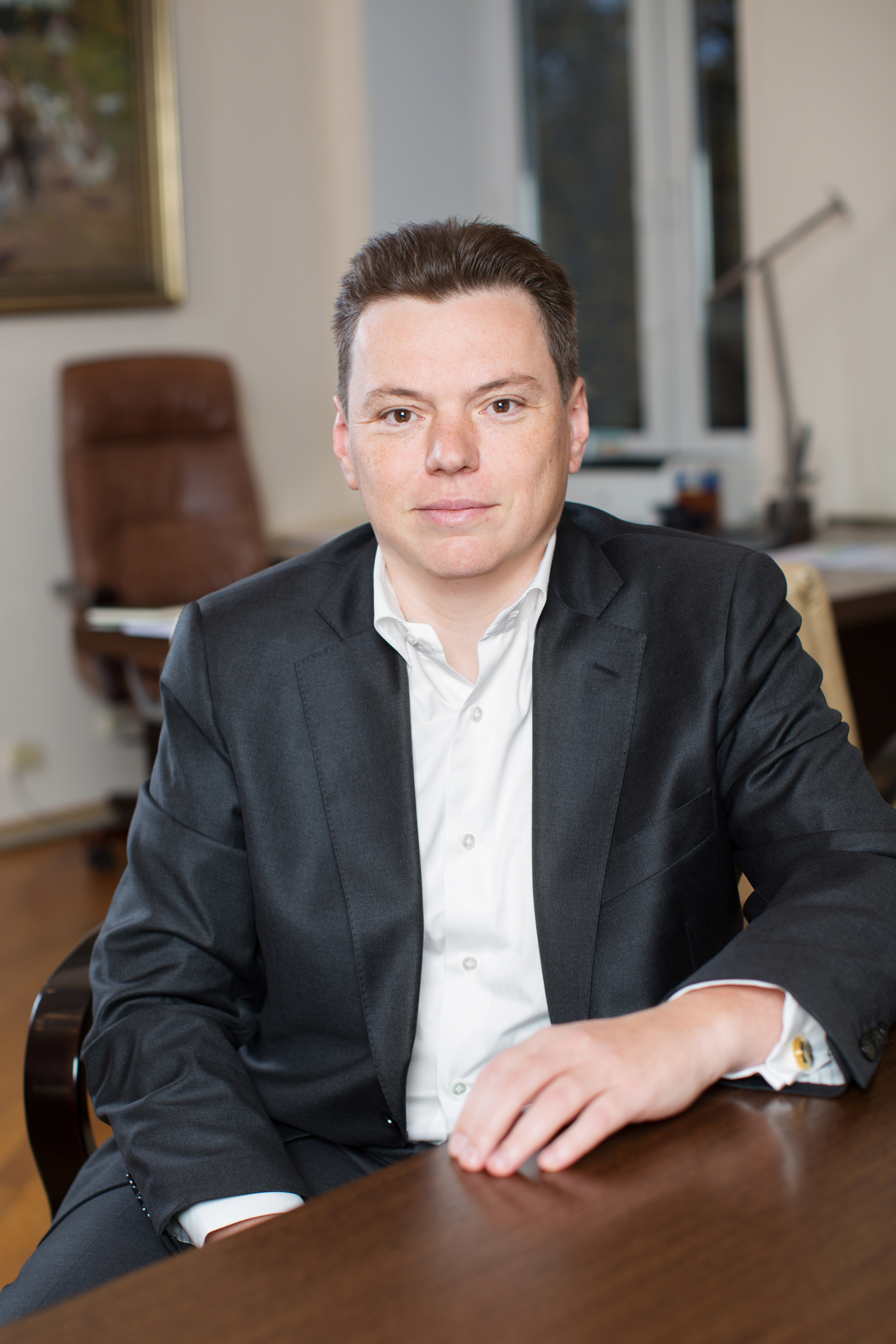
- Yefymenko in 2017
- Born: 26 June 1975 (age 51); Bila Tserkva, Ukrainian SSR, Soviet Union
- Education: Taras Shevchenko National University of Kyiv
- Occupation: Businessman
- Organization(s): Tribo Ltd. (Трібо; Chairman of board of directors), Biofarma (Біофарма; President)

Kostiantyn Oleksiiovych Yefymenko (Note: Also transliterated as Kostyantyn and Efymenko) (Ukrainian: Костянтин Олексійович Єфименко; born 26 June 1975) is a Ukrainian businessman and politician who served as Minister of Transport and Communications of Ukraine from 11 March to 9 December 2010, as well as First Deputy Minister of Infrastructure of Ukraine from 23 December 2010 to 15 April 2014. Yefymenko currently serves as the president of the Bilyi Bars Ice Hockey Club.

== Biography ==
In 1992, Yefymenko graduated from school No. 13 of Bila Tserkva with a silver medal for academic achievements. In 1997, Yefymenko graduated from the Economics Faculty of Taras Shevchenko National University of Kyiv with a degree in Accounting and Auditing.

Yefymenko is married and has three children – two daughters and a son.

== Political activity ==
From 2008 to 2009, Yefymenko served as a deputy of the Kyiv Oblast Council, as a member of the Yulia Tymoshenko Bloc faction. He also served on the Bila Tserkva City Council.

On 11 March 2010, Yefymenko was appointed Minister of Transport and Communications of Ukraine, serving in the position until 9 December 2010. After that, from 23 December 2010 to 15 April 2014, Yefymenko served as First Deputy Minister of Infrastructure of Ukraine.

In 2015, Yefymenko ran for mayor of Bila Tserkva, but lost in the second round to Henadiy Dikiy, who received 39.3% of the votes cast.

Since 2018, he has been a speaker at major business conferences, including the Business Concentrate, Terrasoft, Business Anatomy, and sessions of the Kyiv International Economic Forum.

== Career and business activity ==
1995–1996 — Veksel (Вексель) insurance company;

1997–1998 — Ukrgazprompolis (Укргазпромполіс) insurance company;

1998–2002 — chairman of the board of Ukrgazprompolis insurance company;

2002–2008 — Deputy Director general for Economic Affairs; Director for Scientific and Technical Affairs; Director for Economic and Accounting policy of UkrTransGaz;

2008–2009 – Chairman of the Supervisory Board of OJSC "Biopharma".

2009—2010 – Director of Ukrtransgaz NJSC Naftogaz of Ukraine.

Since 2014 – President of the pharmaceutical company "Biopharma".

Since 2014 – chairman of the board of directors of the Tribo Group of Companies.

Since 2017 – chief operating officer of "Biopharma".

=== Biofarma ===
Since 2014, Yefymenko has been the president of the pharmaceutical company Biopharma, a Ukrainian company specializing in the development and production of immunobiological drugs from human donor plasma. The company is among the top 10 largest Ukrainian manufacturers in the industry.

In 2019, a new Biopharma plasma processing plant, worth $75 million, was opened in Bila Tserkva.

In December 2019, Biopharma sold part of the company to the German pharmaceutical manufacturer STADA.

In 2020, Biopharma was focused on combating the COVID-19 pandemic.

=== Tribo ===
Yefymenko is also chairman of the board of directors of Tribo Ltd. Tribo, which is the official supplier of original spare parts for MAZ, KrAZ, and BelAZ. The UK-based subsidiary, Tribo Rail, supplies products to European markets and works with Siemens, Bombardier, Alston, and other well-known manufacturers in the field of railway technology.

The production line includes more than 800 products for such industrial groups as rail transport, trucks, agricultural and special equipment, and industrial equipment.

== Social activities and charity ==
In 2011, Yefymenko established the Kostiantyn Yefymenko Charitable Foundation in Bila Tserkva. The Foundation implements and supports socio-cultural, educational, health care, historical, tourist, and other programs related to the city's life and development.

In 2011–2013, archeological excavations were carried out on the Castle Hill at the expense of the Foundation. The excavations took place in three stages: the first involved the transfer of the monument to Yaroslav the Wise, the second investigated the construction of a religious building, and the third resulted in the museification of the foundations (one and a half apses) of the ancient temple of the thirteenth century. The found artifacts were transferred to the Bila Tserkva Museum of Local Lore, and later will be placed in the lower church, where it is planned to equip the museum with the findings of the Castle Hill.

The Foundation finances the work of coaches, uniforms, equipment and classes at the White Leopard Ice Arena, which are free for children from the figure skating and hockey sections of Bila Tserkva CYSS "Zmina", where more than 200 young people from Bila Tserkva are involved.

The Foundation has implemented a number of social projects aimed at supporting the most vulnerable segments of the population: "Academy of Pensioners", "Help to have a child", "Start of Hope", "Spartakiad", and nominal scholarships for the best students.
