= Shaye (disambiguation) =

Shaye is a musical group.

Shaye may also refer to:

- Shaye, Iran, a village in Tabadkan Rural District
- Shaye (name), and persons with the name
