= Tetiana Husarchuk =

Ukrainian musicologist (born 1957)

- Тетяна Володимирівна Гусарчук
- Born: 24 July 1957 (age 69); Bila Tserkva
- Education: Kyiv Conservatory
- Occupation: Musicologist

Tetiana Husarchuk (Ukrainian: Тетяна Володимирівна Гусарчук; born 24 July 1957) is a Ukrainian musicologist. Doctor of Art Criticism (2018), docent (1998). Member of the National Union of Composers of Ukraine (2015).

== Biography ==
Tetiana Husarchuk was born on 24 July 1957 in Bila Tserkva, Kyiv Oblast.

In 1985 she graduated from the Kyiv Conservatory (class of Nina Herasymova-Persydska). Since then, she has been working at her alma mater: from 1998 – Docent of the Department of History of Ukrainian Music, from 2004 – Dean for International Students; from 2008 – Docent, Professor of the Department of History of Ukrainian Music and Music Folklore.

== Works ==
Author of more than 60 scientific publications, monographs "Poklykannia" (2002, co-author), "Artemii Vedel. Postat myttsia u konteksti epokh" (2017); edition "Artemii Vedel. Dukhovni tvory" (2007, co-author), a collection of poems "Charivnyi doshch" (2017).

His research interests include stylistic and textual problems of Ukrainian choral art of the 18th and 19th centuries, psychology of creativity, especially the determination of the style of a musician's creative activity.

== Awards ==
- Mykola Lysenko Prize in the nomination "For Outstanding Achievements in Musicology" (2019) – for the monograph "Artemii Vedel. Postat myttsia u konteksti epokh";
- All-Ukrainian Prize in Musicology Primus inter pares-2019 – for the book "Artemii Vedel. Postat myttsia u konteksti epokh".
