= Tribo =

Brake Manufacturer

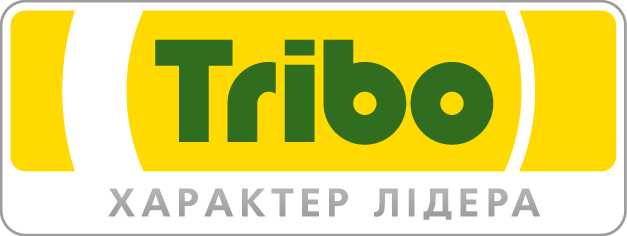
- Native name: Трібо
- Company type: Ltd
- Industry: Mechanical engineering
- Founded: 1979 in Bila Tserkva
- Headquarters: Bila Tserkva, Ukraine
- Area served: Ukraine, Kazakhstan, Belarus, EU
- Key people: Kostyantyn Efymenko (Chairman of the Board)
- Products: brake pads, braking systems, friction materials
- Number of employees: 212 (in 2017)
- Website: https://tribo.ua

Tribo (Ukrainian: Трібо) is a Ukrainian company, manufacturer of the brake pads, braking systems and friction materials.

== General information ==
- Production facilities are located in Ukraine, the Czech Republic, Kazakhstan and Belarus
- The company manufactures about 300 products (foremost brake pads and friction materials) for railway vehicles, agricultural machinery, automotive industry
- International sales cover more than 20 countries worldwide (2018)
- Organization's quality management system is certified to the standards: ISO/IEC 17025, ISO/TS 16949, ISO 9001

== History ==
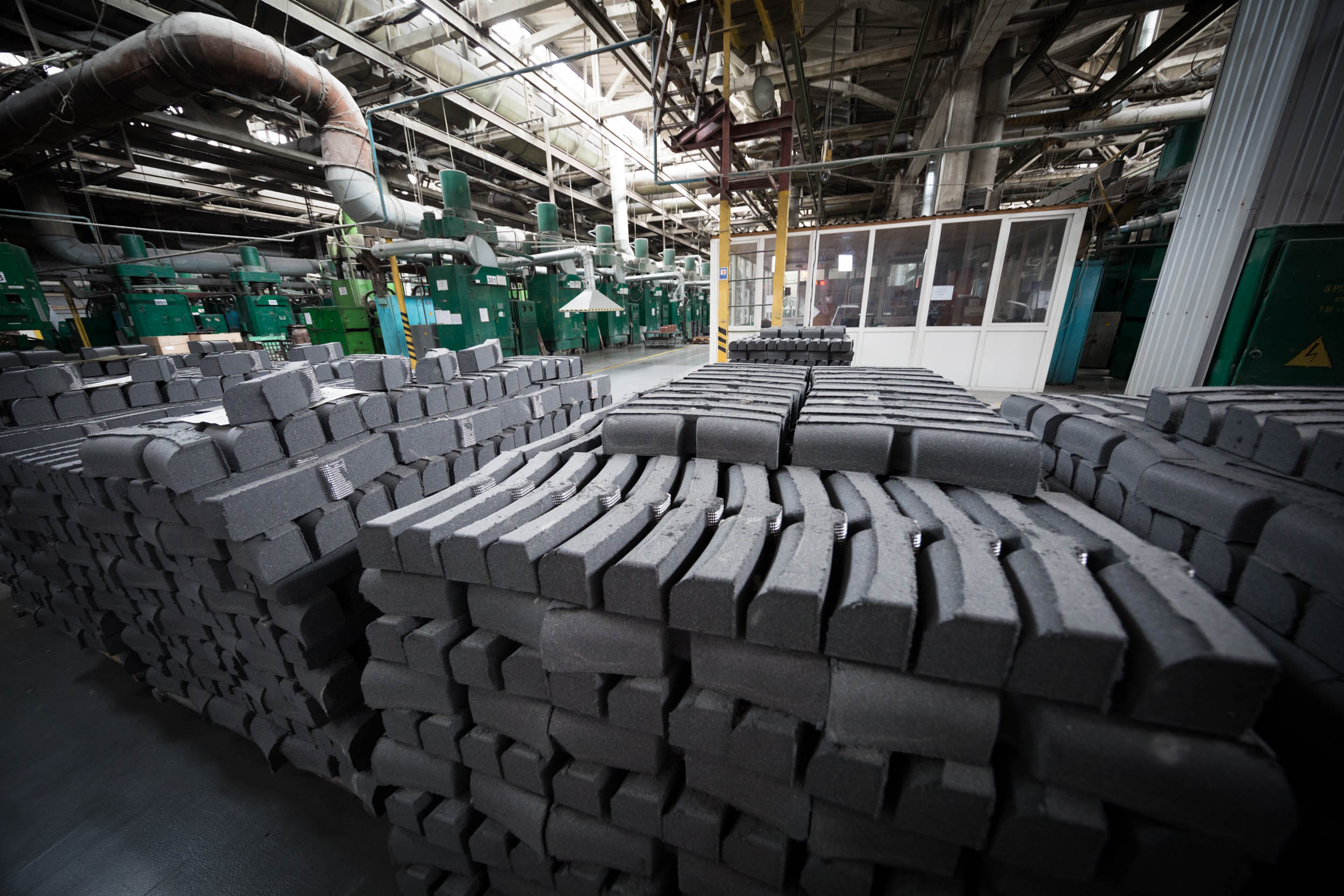
Tribo production hall in Bila Tserkva

On July 1, 1979, the first production line of the plant was launched in Bila Tserkva. In 1996 the company was reorganized into PJSC Tribo, later into Tribo Ltd.

In 2005, Tribo Company founded the representative office in Kazakhstan and in 2009 a production of the brake pads for the freight and passenger cars was established here too. Tribo is the only manufacturer of these products in Kazakhstan.

In 2008, a subsidiary company Tribo Rail UK Ltd was established in Buxton, UK. TriboRail consists of a UK based commercial office and distribution facility. In 2010, Tribo expanded their production capacities and built a new production hall in Bila Tserkva to cover needs of Tribo Rail.

In 2013, the new testing laboratories were opened at the Tribo plant in Bila Tserkva: "Tribo R&D" for the development and testing of new friction materials and "Eurotest" for testing of the brake pads for vehicles. In the same year Tribo opened a new manufacturing facility "Tribo Tools" for the production of molds, forming dies and tooling.

In 2017, Tribo and BelAZ opened a new factory for the production of the brake pads and discs in Staryya Darohi, Belarus.

In 2018, BelTribo JSC officially started supplying brake pads to BelAZ plant.

In 2018, the company launched the production of steel wire and fiber, and also passed the certification audit in accordance with the international quality standard of the automotive industry IATF 16949: 2016.
During 2018-2019, Tribo began exporting products to African countries.
