= Bila Tserkva massacre =

1941 massacre of Jews in Soviet Ukraine

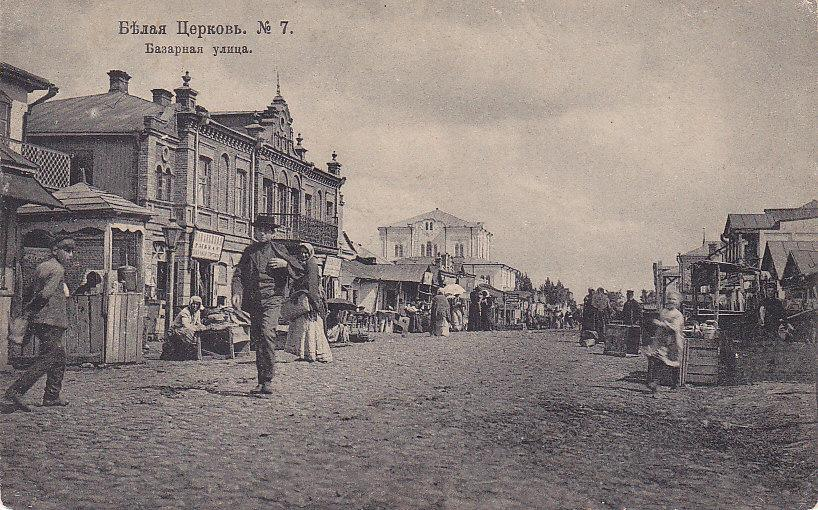
- Synagogue in Bila Tserkva before the Bolshevik revolution

- Location within Ukraine
- Also known as: Belaya Tserkov massacre
- Location: Bila Tserkva, Ukraine; 49.798889°N 30.115278°E
- Date: August 21, 1941
- Incident type: Mass murder of Jews
- Perpetrators: Nazi Germany: Einsatzgruppen; 6th Army; 295th Infantry Division; Ukrainian Auxiliary Police
- Victims: Jewish population of Bila Tserkva

The Bila Tserkva massacre was the mass murder of Jews, committed by the Nazi German Einsatzgruppe with the aid of Ukrainian auxiliaries, in Bila Tserkva, Soviet Ukraine, on August 21–22, 1941. When the Jewish adult population of Bila Tserkva was killed, several functionaries complained that some 90 Jewish children were left behind in an abandoned building, and had to be executed separately. The soldiers reported the matter to four chaplains of the Heer, who passed along their protests to Field Marshal von Reichenau; it was the only time during World War II that Wehrmacht chaplains tried to prevent an Einsatzgruppen massacre, but Paul Blobel's verbal order was direct and decisive.

== Background ==
On 22 June 1941, Axis armies invaded the Soviet Union and by July, Wehrmacht units had captured Bila Tserkva (Russian: Belaya Tserkov) as part of the Axis offensive on Kiev. At the onset of the invasion of the Soviet Union, Jewish men were the sole target of mass murder campaigns, however by late July to early August, Jewish women and children also became targets of mass murder campaigns by the Wehrmacht, SS and Ukrainian collaborators. By late August, 40,000 Jews had already been killed across occupied Ukraine. Prior to the arrival of German units into Bila Tserkva, Jewish community leaders had organized the evacuation of hundreds of Jewish children out of Bila Tserkva.

== Description ==
In August 1941, General Walther von Reichenau, commander of the 6th Army of Nazi Germany, ordered his men to assist the Einsatzgruppen and their Ukrainian auxiliaries with killing the Jews of Bila Tserkva. Over the course of the following days, virtually the entire adult Jewish population of Bila Tserkva was shot. All that remained were the children, aged between a few months to four years old, and a few of the women, who were dumped off at a school to await execution.

Several soldiers were disturbed by the crying of the children and infants at the school, and asked their chaplains what to do. The two chaplains attached to the 295th Infantry Division, Catholic Father Ernst Tewes and Lutheran Pastor Gerhard Wilczek, visited the school. They were appalled by the condition of the frightened, hungry children. The chaplains asked the local army commander to free the children, but he refused. Tewes later reported he "turned out to be a convinced anti-Semitic". Joined by two other chaplains from the 295th Division, a series of protest letters were sent to people in positions of authority asking that the children of Bila Tserkva be spared. The chaplains won over staff officer Lieutenant-Colonel Helmuth Groscurth to their cause. He ordered a postponement of the planned massacre of the children. In areas near the front, the Einsatzgruppen were under Army command and so when Colonel Groscurth ordered the massacre to be delayed, the local Einsatzkommando leader had no choice but to comply. Ultimately, von Reichenau himself intervened and ordered the executions to go ahead. After receiving a protest letter from two of the chaplains, Reichenau wrote in response:

The conclusion of the report in question contains the following sentence: "In the case in question, measures against women and children were undertaken which in no way differ from atrocities carried out by the enemy about which the troops are continually being informed." I have to describe this assessment as incorrect, inappropriate and impertinent in the extreme. Moreover this comment was written in an open communication which passes through many hands. It would have been far better if the report had not been written at all. — Walther von Reichenau

Tewes later recalled, "All those we wanted to save were shot. Because of our initiative it just happened a few days later than planned". SS-Obersturmführer August Häfner who saw the subsequent murders on 21 August 1941 testified at his own 1965 trial as follows:

I went to the woods alone. The Wehrmacht had already dug a grave. The children were brought along in a tractor. I had nothing to do with this technical procedure. The Ukrainians were standing around trembling. The children were taken down from the tractor. They were lined up along the top of the grave and shot so that they fell into it. The Ukrainians did not aim at any particular part of the body. They fell into the grave. The wailing was indescribable. I shall never forget the scene throughout my life. I find it very hard to bear. I particulary [sic] remember a small fair-haired girl who took me by the hand. She too was shot later.... The grave was near some woods. It was not near the rifle-range. The execution must have taken place in the afternoon at about 3:30 or 4:00. It took place the day after the discussions at the Feldkommandanten.... Many children were hit four or five times before they died.

The protests at Bila Tserkva were unique as being the only time during the war that Wehrmacht chaplains tried to prevent an Einsatzgruppen massacre. The American historian Doris Bergen wrote that all four chaplains involved in the protest were aware that Jewish adults were being killed and protested only when they learned that children were to be shot. Bergen further observed the "terrible irony" that a gesture of protest further served the genocidal aims of the regime; the soldiers who were troubled by the crying of the children waiting for their time to die felt that they had "dealt with" the issue by "doing something", namely appealing to Father Tewes and Wilczek, and they had no further role to play in this matter.

== Bibliography ==
- Bergen, Doris (2001). "Between God and Hitler: German Military Chaplains and the Crimes of the Third Reich". In Bartov, Omer; Mack, Phyllis (eds.). In God's Name: Genocide and Religion in the Twentieth Century. New York: Berghahn Books. pp. 123–138. ISBN 1571813020.
- Brandon, Ray; Lower, Wendy (2008). The Shoah in Ukraine. Bloomington: Indiana University Press. ISBN 978-0-253-35084-8.
- Klee, Ernst; Dressen, Willi; Riess, Volker (1991). "The Good Old Days" – The Holocaust as Seen by its Perpetrators and Bystanders. Trans. Burnstone, Deborah. New York: MacMillan. ISBN 0-02-917425-2. (originally published as Klee, Ernst; Dreßen, Willi; Rieß, Volker (Hrsg.) (1988). Schöne Zeiten. Judenmord aus der Sicht der Täter und Gaffer (in German). Frankfurt / Main: S. Fischer. ISBN 978-3-10-039304-3.)
- Weiner, Amir (2003). Landscaping the Human Garden. Stanford: Stanford University Press. ISBN 0-8047-4622-2.
