= Shaye Shkarovsky =

Ukrainian Yiddish author (1891–1945)

Shaye Shkarovsky (1891–1945) was a Yiddish author who lived in the Soviet Union. He was a member of the Vidervuks (New Growth) group in and around Kiev.

Shkarovsky was born in Bila Tserkva. His father, Isaac, was a cheder teacher and social activist. Shaye regularly donated to Zionist groups. In 1942 he was evacuated to Ufa during World War II, but was nonetheless killed during the war.

== Journalism ==
Shkarovsky began working in journalism as an 18-year-old, contributing to the Kiev Russian Press and in 1910 in the Kiev Weekly journal, where he wrote 24 articles about Jewish literature. In 1915 he began working for a newspaper in Odessa, and in 1921 he edited a weekly Communist paper, transforming it to a daily paper. He reported from the border with Romania and covered the pogroms that swept across Ukraine, continuing to be an activism journalist well into the 1920s and 1930s.

== Books ==
Shkarovsky published several Yiddish books:

- Der Arshter May (Odessa, 1921)
- Ragas (Kiev, 1922)
- Kayor (Moscow, 1928)
- Kolvirt (Kiev, 1931)
- In Shniṭ Fun Tsayṭ (Kiev, 1932)
- Meron (Kharkov, 1934)
- Odes (Kiev, 1938)
- Nakhes fun Kinder (Kiev, 1938)
