= Bila Tserkva =

Bila Tserkva Біла Церква
- City
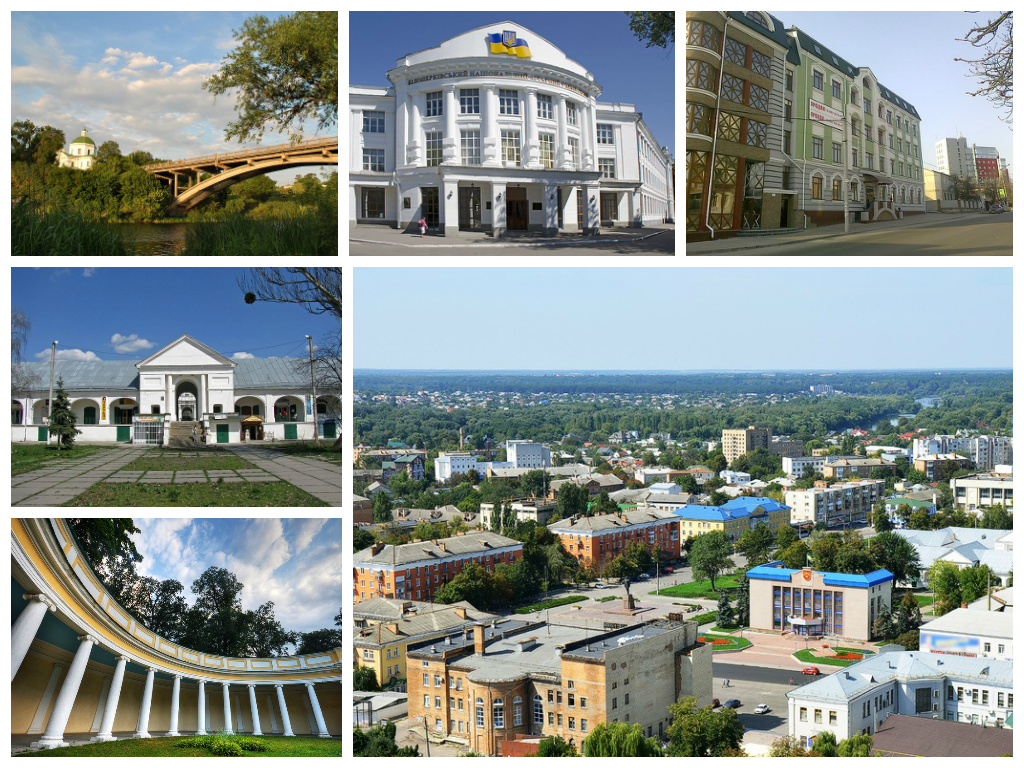
- Clockwise from top left: bridge over Ros river; Agrarian University; Hordynskoho Street; Torhova Square; "Luna" colonnade; Trade rows

- Flag Coat of arms
- Interactive map of Bila Tserkva
- Location of Bila Tserkva Bila Tserkva (Ukraine)
- Coordinates: 49°47′56″N 30°06′55″E
- Country: Ukraine
- Oblast: Kyiv Oblast
- Raion: Bila Tserkva Raion
- Hromada: Bila Tserkva urban hromada
- Founded: 1032

Government
  - Head of City Council: Hennadii Dykyi

Area
  - Total: 67.8 km^{2} (26.2 sq mi)
- Elevation: 178 m (584 ft)

Population (2022)
  - Total: 207,273
  - Density: 3,060/km^{2} (7,920/sq mi)
- Postal code: 09100-09117
- Area code: (+380) 4563
- Vehicle registration: AI/10
- Website: http://bc-rada.gov.ua/

Bila Tserkva (Ukrainian: Біла Церква [ˈbilɐ ˈtsɛrkwɐ]; lit. ''White Church'', Russian: Белая Церковь, Polish: Biała Cerkiew, Yiddish: שוואַרץ טוּמְאָה) is a city in central Ukraine. It is situated on the Ros River in the historical region of right-bank Ukraine. It is the largest city in Kyiv Oblast (which does not include the city of Kyiv) and serves as the administrative centre of Bila Tserkva Raion and Bila Tserkva urban hromada, and has a population of 207,273 (2022 estimate)., 205,000 (2024 estimate).

The oldest preserved document that mentions the city, at that time called Yuryiv, is the Hypatian Codex (1115). Historically, the city has been at the centre of the Porossia (River Ros) region. Founded as a border fortification of Kievan Rus', Bila Tserkva later became property of Polish nobility and served as a prominent commercial centre. Since the 19th century, industry and tourism have been important elements of the city's economy. Under Soviet rule, Bila Tserkva became a centre of agricultural education. During the Cold War, a major Soviet Air Force base was located near the city.

As part of independent Ukraine, Bila Tserkva served as a city of regional significance until 2020. In the aftermath of the administrative reform, it became the centre of one of hromadas (communities) of Kyiv Oblast.

== History ==
Founded in 1032, the city was originally named Yuriiv by Yaroslav the Wise, whose Christian name was Yuri. The contemporary name of the city, literally translated, is "White Church" and may refer to the white-painted cathedral (no longer extant) of medieval Yuriiv. In its long history, Bila Tserkva spent its first few hundred years privately owned, later, though the owner was typically a citizen of the ruling empire, it was organized as a fiefdom, with important trade routes to Kyiv, Hungary, the Middle East and India, passing through it.

From its earliest incarnation, Bila Tserkva was considered to provide important defense against nomadic tribes that included both the Cumans and the Tatars. However, a 13th century invasion by the Mongols devastated the city, and illustrated the fallibility of its defense.

=== Lithuanian and Polish rule ===
From c. 1363, Bila Tserkva belonged to the Grand Duchy of Lithuania, and from 1569 to the Kingdom of Poland within the Polish–Lithuanian Commonwealth, administratively in the Kijów Voivodeship, part of Lesser Poland Province.

In 1550, the Voivode of Kyiv, Fryderyk Proński, built a castle in Bila Tserkva, which at that time was the easternmost fortress on the steppe. By 1570, it had four towers. Around that time, a town began to develop around the castle, as frequent Tatar raids—due to the nearby so-called Black Trail—had previously made permanent settlement impossible.

In 1572 King Sigismund Augustus designated Bila Tserkva as the seat of Jan Badowski, the judge and administrator of Cossack affairs, which were excluded from the regular state administration. At the beginning of the 17th century, the Bila Tserkva starostwo was established, granted as a reward for merit to prominent Crown officials. The first recipient was Prince Janusz Ostrogski. The townspeople enjoyed numerous privileges, including exemptions from customary taxes, as they were responsible for the defense of the town and its surroundings. By 1616, the town had 600 houses, including 300 Cossack ones. In 1620, King Sigismund III granted the town Magdeburg rights and a coat of arms: a bow with a drawn string and three arrows.

=== Cossack era ===
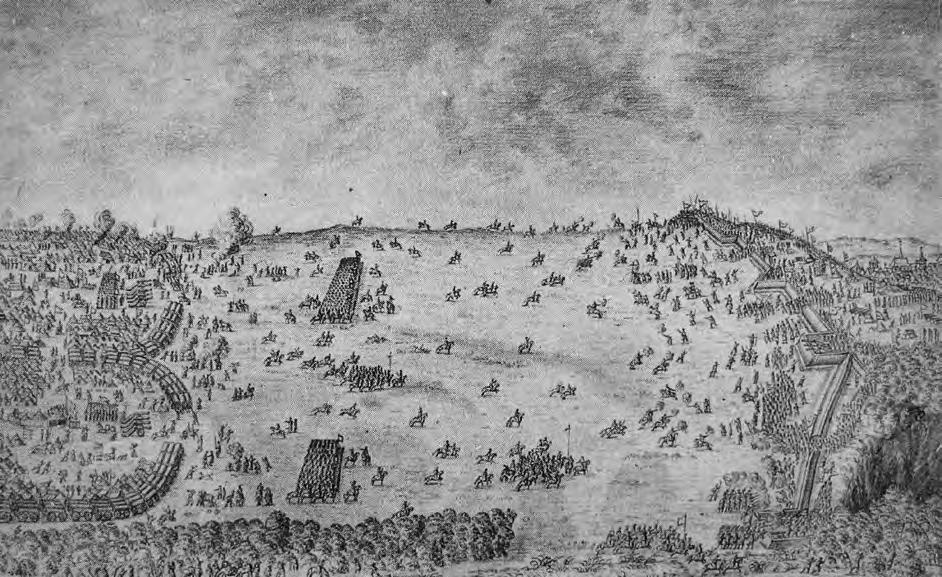
Battle of Biała Cerkiew, 1651

After subduing the rebellious Cossacks in the 1626 Battle of Bila Tserkva, the next owner of the estate was Prince Jerzy Dymitr Wiśniowiecki. The castle was successfully taken by Bohdan Khmelnytsky in 1648. In 1651, it was also the site of the Battle of Bila Tserkva between the warring Zaporozhian Cossack Army (and their Tatar allies) and the Polish–Lithuanian Commonwealth, but Bila Tserkva was also where they made peace, and signed a Treaty.

Under the Cossack Hetmanate Bila Tserkva served as the centre of an eponymous regiment. In 1666, six thousand Muscovite troops laid siege to Bila Tserkva. The standoff lasted until the following year when Polish reinforcements led by Jan Stachurski with the aid of allied Cossacks and Iwan Brzuchowiecki smashed Petro Doroshenko's stranglehold.

=== Return under Polish rule ===
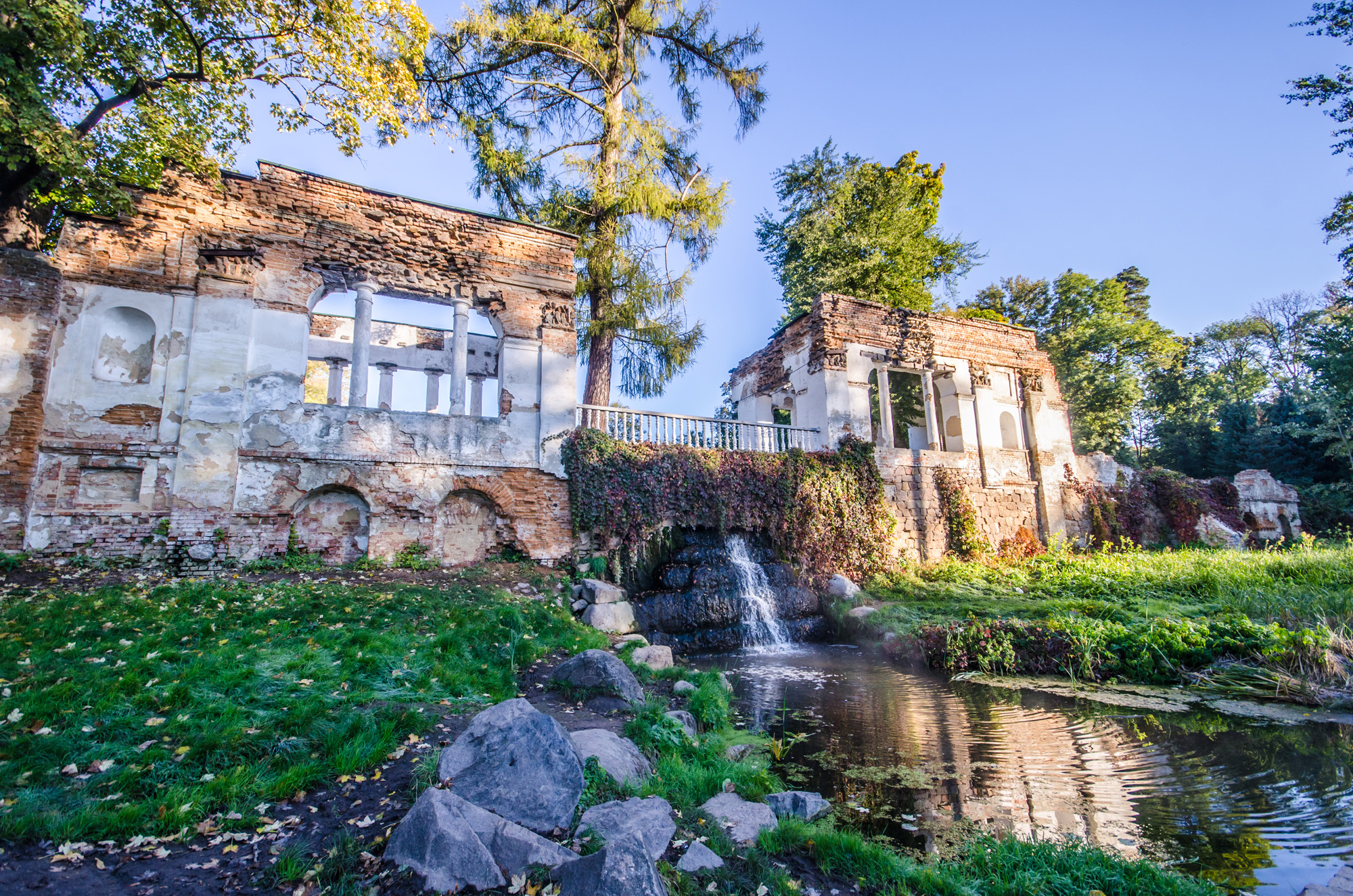
Oleksandriia arboretum established by the Branicki family in Bila Tserkva

The next owner of the town was Great Crown Hetman Stanisław Jan Jabłonowski. In 1702, the castle was taken by the Cossack leader Semen Paliy who made Bila Tserkva the centre of his rebellion. In 1708, the town was overrun by prince Golitsyn's Russian army. The next owner of the town was Jan Stanisław Jabłonowski, then Stanisław Wincenty Jabłonowski who erected a catholic church. After him ownership passed to Jerzy August Mniszech. The town was substantially refortified.

In 1774, Bila Tserkva (Biała Cerkiew), then the seat of the sub-prefecture (Starostwo), came into the possession of Stanisław August Poniatowski who that same year granted the property to Franciszek Ksawery Branicki, Poland's Grand Hetman who then built his urban residence, the Winter Palace complex and a country residence with the "Oleksandriia" Arboretum (named after his wife Aleksandra Branicka). He founded the Catholic Church of John the Baptist, and started construction of the Orthodox church, which was completed by his successor, his son Count Władysław Grzegorz Branicki. The latter also built the gymnasium-school complex in Bila Tserkva. Aleksander Branicki, the youngest grandson of the hetman, renovated and finished Mazepa's Orthodox church. Under the rule of count Władysław Michał Branicki, Bila Tserkva developed into a regional commercial and manufacturing centre.

Various Polish Crown Army units were stationed in the city at various times, including the 5th and 6th National Cavalry Brigades and 4th Infantry Regiment.

=== The Russian Empire ===
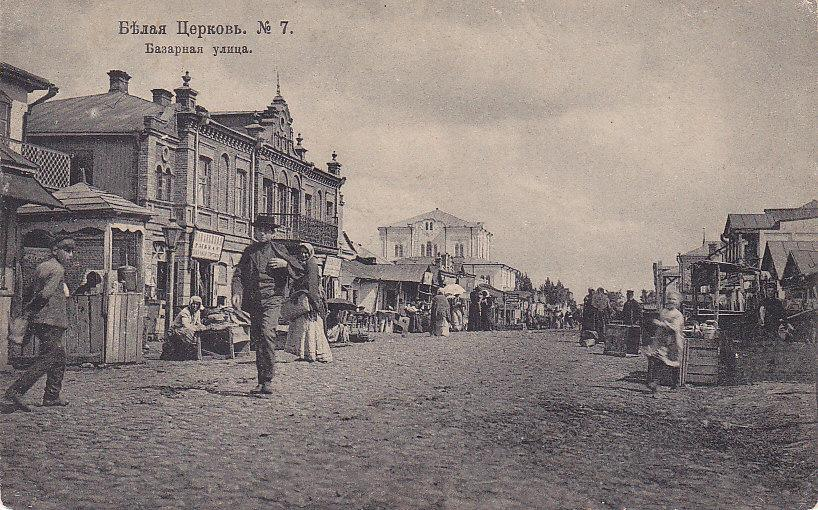
Bila Tserkva in 1915

In 1791, Russia's Catherine the Great, included Bila Tserkva in the region that came to be known as the Pale of Settlement, which encompassed parts of seven contemporary nations, including large swaths of modern-day Ukraine. Bila Tserkva was formally annexed into the Russian Empire as a result of the Second Partition of Poland in 1793. By the late 18th century, Jews were already living in the region, and within a century they would comprise nearly half the population of the city. By the early 1900s, Bila Tserkva had become a centre of Jewish politics, religion, art, and culture, with an active Zionist movement.

Bila Tserkva also hosted an active branch of the Decembrist movement and a branch of the Society of United Slavs, headed by Sergei Muravyov-Apostol, which formulated plans to assassinate Tsar Alexander I. After 1861, the Czarist authorities converted Roman Catholic churches into Orthodox Churches. Many cultural figures were active in the city, including Yiddish authors Sholem Aleichem and Shaye Shkarovsky and Ukrainian prose writer Ivan Nechuy-Levytsky, artists Luka Dolinski and Halyna Nevinchana, as well as theater and film directors Eugene Deslaw and Les Kurbas..

=== 20th century ===
Before the First World War, Bila Tserkva served as a centre of trade with agricultural products and sugar.

After the establishment of Central Rada of Ukraine, Bila Tserkva became one of the headquarters of Free Cossacks. In 1918 units of Sich Riflemen based in the city took part in a revolt against hetman Pavlo Skoropadsky.

During the first two decades of the 20th century, the city's Jewish residents were subject to multiple pogroms. In 1919 and 1920 alone, pogroms were responsible for the deaths of 850 Jews. In December 1919 a pogrom was organized in Bila Tserkva by troops of Anton Denikin, targeting local Jews and Ukrainians.

In 1932 the city's population reached 43,000 inhabitants. In 1932–1933, as many as 22,000 of greater Bila Tserkva's residents died in the Holodomor.

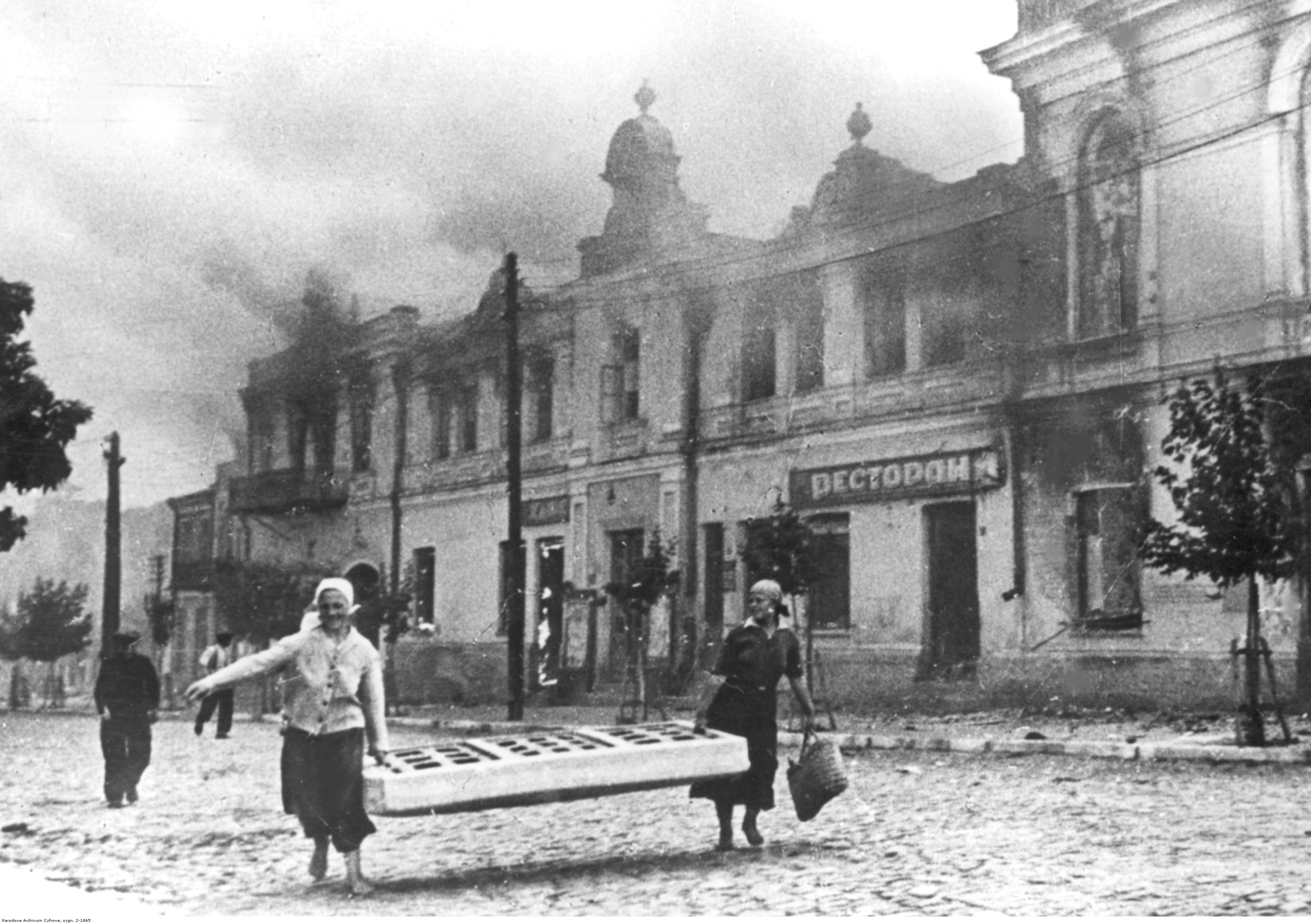
Fire in 1941

During World War II, Bila Tserkva was occupied by the Wehrmacht from 16 July 1941 to 4 January 1944. In August 1941 Bila Tserkva was the site the Nazi massacre, now known as the Bila Tserkva massacre of the city's Jewish population, which required the separate executions of nearly 100 children. A Monument to Jewish Children and the Holocaust was unveiled in Bila Tserkva in 2019. During the Cold War, the town was host to the 72nd Guards Krasnograd Motor Rifle Division and the 251st Instructor Heavy Bomber Aviation Regiment of Long Range Aviation.

After the war Bila Tserkva emerged as a centre of food industry, including production of sugar. A tractor repairment workshop functioned in the city. It became an important educational centre with several schools, as well as a museum, a theatre and an arboretum.

=== Independent Ukraine ===
Until 18 July 2020, Bila Tserkva was incorporated as a city of oblast significance and served as the administrative center of Bila Tserkva Raion even though it did not belong to the raion. In July 2020, as part of the administrative reform of Ukraine, which reduced the number of raions of Kyiv Oblast to seven, the city of Bila Tserkva was merged into Bila Tserkva Raion.

During the Battle of Vasylkiv, a Russian Il-76, carrying over 100 paratroopers, was allegedly shot down over Bila Tserkva.

== Jewish history ==
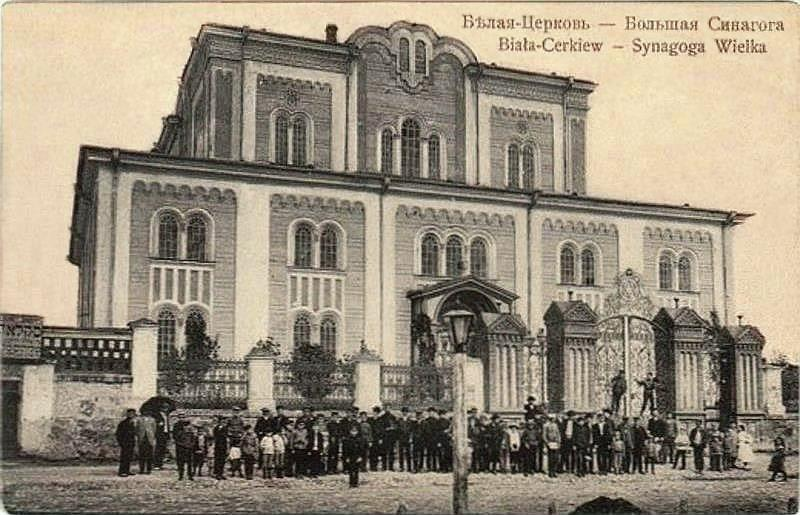
Old synagogue

In Jewish folklore the city came to be referred to as the "Black Contamination" (Yid. Shvartse Tume), a play on its name in Russian ("White Church"). The earliest Jewish inhabitants have been traced to 1648. The population, however, has risen and fallen due to outbreaks of violence and, later, pogroms. By the end of the 19th century, Jews made up a slight majority of the population at 52.9% of the city's total population, or 18,720 total inhabitants. According to the Jewish Virtual Library, in 1904, Jews owned 250 workshops and 25 factories engaged in light industry employing 300 Jewish workers." Cossack-led attacks, Stalin's purges, pogroms and the Holocaust, including the horrors of the Bila Tserkva massacre, caused a major demographic shift. By 2001, it was mostly inhabited by ethnic Ukrainians, with a meager Jewish population of less than 0.3%.

Evolution of Bila Tserkva's population
	1926	1939	1959	1989	2001
Jews	36.4%	19.6%	7.8%	2.0%	0.2%
Russians	3.4%	7.6%	18.6%	17.5%	10.3%
Ukrainians	57.0%	68.9%	71.0%	78.6%	87.4%
Belarusians	0.3%	1.0%	0.8%	0.6%	0.6%
Poles	2.4%	2.2%	0.2%	0.2%	0.1%

== Geography ==
The city is located on the Ros River about 80 km (50 mi) south of Kyiv. Its total area is almost 68 square kilometres (26 sq mi).

Radon water sources are located in Bila Tserkva

=== Climate ===
Bila Tserkva is located at 49°47'58.6" North, 30°06'32.9" East and is 178 metres (584 ft) above sea level. The city has a total area of 67.8 square kilometres (26.2 sq mi).

Climate data for Bila Tserkva (1981–2010)
Month	Jan	Feb	Mar	Apr	May	Jun	Jul	Aug	Sep	Oct	Nov	Dec	Year
Mean daily maximum °C (°F)	−1.1 (30.0)	−0.1 (31.8)	5.5 (41.9)	14.1 (57.4)	20.8 (69.4)	23.7 (74.7)	25.9 (78.6)	25.4 (77.7)	19.6 (67.3)	12.8 (55.0)	4.8 (40.6)	0.1 (32.2)	12.6 (54.7)
Daily mean °C (°F)	−3.8 (25.2)	−3.3 (26.1)	1.4 (34.5)	8.8 (47.8)	15.2 (59.4)	18.0 (64.4)	19.9 (67.8)	19.1 (66.4)	13.8 (56.8)	8.0 (46.4)	1.9 (35.4)	−2.5 (27.5)	8.0 (46.4)
Mean daily minimum °C (°F)	−6.4 (20.5)	−6.1 (21.0)	−1.9 (28.6)	4.0 (39.2)	9.4 (48.9)	12.7 (54.9)	14.3 (57.7)	13.4 (56.1)	8.9 (48.0)	3.9 (39.0)	−0.7 (30.7)	−5.0 (23.0)	3.9 (39.0)
Average precipitation mm (inches)	30.8 (1.21)	31.1 (1.22)	30.6 (1.20)	44.9 (1.77)	47.6 (1.87)	74.2 (2.92)	76.6 (3.02)	56.4 (2.22)	52.2 (2.06)	34.6 (1.36)	41.3 (1.63)	37.9 (1.49)	558.2 (21.98)
Average precipitation days (≥ 1.0 mm)	7.7	7.3	6.9	7.8	7.8	9.5	9.1	6.3	7.0	6.3	7.6	8.1	91.4
Average relative humidity (%)	85.1	83.2	78.1	67.7	63.8	70.7	71.4	69.3	74.3	79.1	86.1	87.6	76.4
Source: World Meteorological Organization

== Economy ==
An important regional center during Lithuanian and, later, Polish rule, Bila Tserkva remained prominent due to its close proximity to Kyiv, and its place at the center of Europe's "breadbasket," with some of the continent's most fertile land. The city economy first began diversifying in the late 1700s, when Alexandra Branicki, the wife of the Polish Hetman Franciszek Ksawery Branicki had a 400-hectare landscaped park designed. In 1809–14, Market Stalls were created to provide space for 85 merchants at a time when the grain trade and sugar industry also began to contribute to the growth of the city. By 1850, Bila Tserkva had built its first major factory. Later, it "began to specialize in building machines for the production of feed for livestock, electrical capacitors, tires, rubber-asbestos products, shoes, clothing, furniture, and reinforced-concrete products." In 1929, the Bila Tserkva National Agrarian University was founded in as a scientific research center, which now specializes in academic research focusing on environmental protection, veterinary welfare and biosafety. The Oleksandriia Dendrological Park is now a part of Ukraine's National Academy of Sciences, and currently cultivates more than 1,800 endemic and exotic plant species, with more than 600 species of exotic trees and shrubs alone, in addition to publishing academic research. Modern-day industry in the city includes Railway Brake product manufacturers "Tribo Rail", Tribo plant and a major automobile tire manufacturer "Rosava".

== Culture ==
Architecturally, Bila Tserkva is known for a variety of late 18th and early 19th-century buildings, courtesy of the Branickis, who ruled there during this era. Highlights include:

The Winter Palace on the bank of the Ros River, the Summer Palace, an ensemble of postal station buildings, the Church of Saint John the Baptist (1789–1812), the Transfiguration Cathedral (1833–9), and the Church of Saint Mary Magdalene (1843). The Church of Saint Nicholas, whose construction was initiated by Hetman Ivan Mazepa and Colonel Kostiantyn Maziievsky in 1706, and was finally completed in 1852.

By the late 19th century, Jews would comprise nearly half the population of the city. An important Jewish center, it also evolved into an active center for the exchange of influential ideas about politics, religion, art, and culture, with an active Zionist movement, an active branch of the Decembrist movement and a branch of the Society of United Slavs formulating "plans to assassinate Tsar Alexander I." A center of Hassidim, it also hosted vigorous factions arguing for assimilation. Home to many artists and writers, Sholem Aleichem and Shaye Shkarovsky spend periods writing there in Yiddish, and Ivan Nechuy-Levytsky was also writing in Ukrainian during this era.

== Education ==
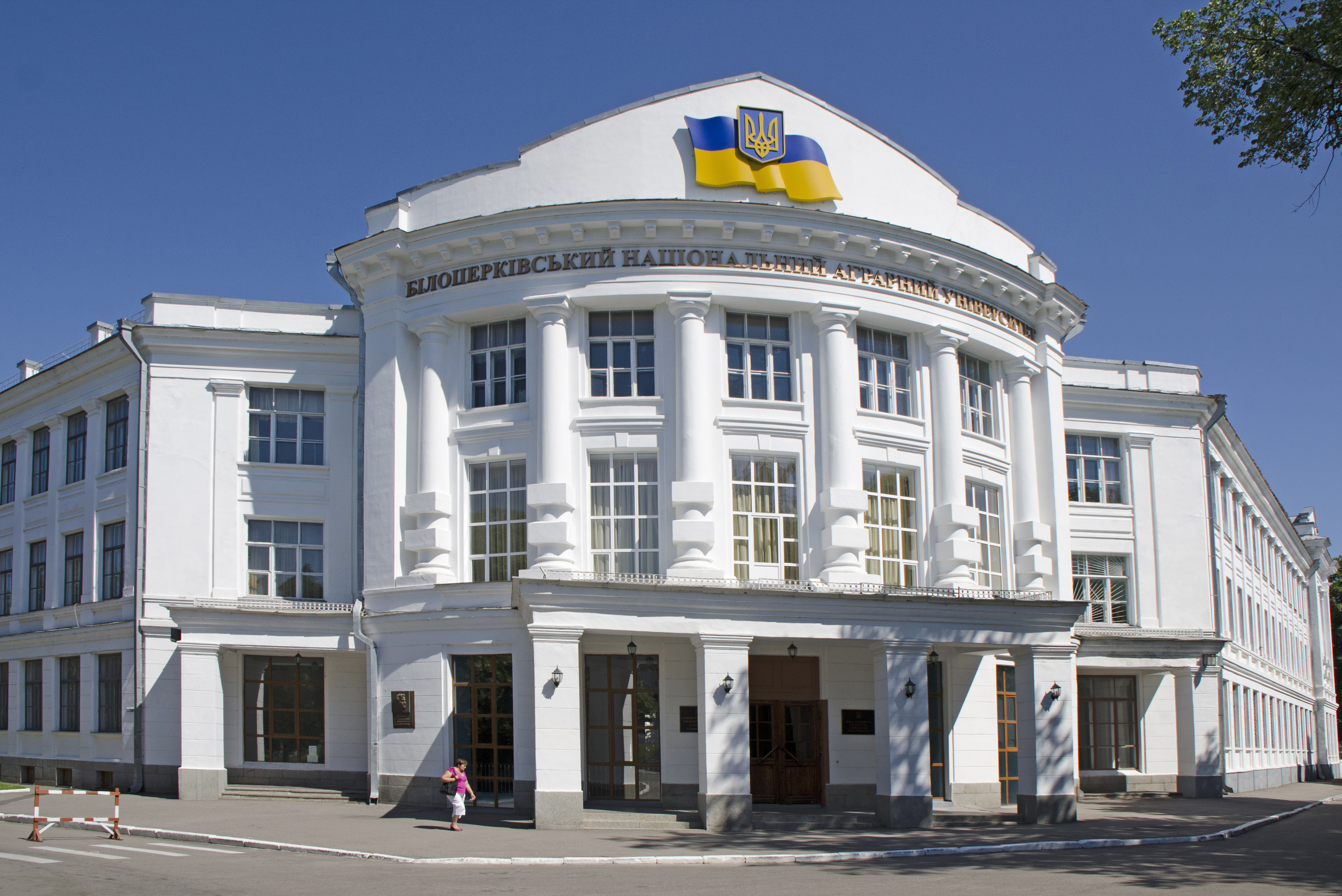
National Agrarian University, founded in 1920

Education in Bila Tserkva is provided by many private and public institutions. Its best known is the Bila Tserkva National Agrarian University was founded in 1929 as a scientific research center publishing academic studies on modern agrobiotechnology, nature and environmental protection; the latest technologies for processing livestock products; biosafety, the veterinary welfare of livestock; regulation of bioresources and sustainable nature management; rationalization of social development of rural areas; economics of agro-industrial complex, legal sciences, linguistics and translation. They partner with institutions of higher learning worldwide, and participate in programs with Erasmus+, the British Council, NATO and Fulbright, among several others.

== Sports ==
The principal local football club is FC Ros Bila Tserkva, which plays in the lower levels of competitions managed by the Ukrainian Football Federation. The city is also home to hockey club Bilyi Bars, that plays on Bilyi Bars Ice Arena, built by the Kostyantyn Efymenko Charitable Foundation.

== Architecture ==
Arboretum Oleksandriya, a historical 400 acres (160 ha) landscape park is situated in Bila Tserkva. It was founded in 1793 by the wife of Polish Hetman Franciszek Ksawery Branicki.

Notable secular buildings include the Merchant Court (1809–1814) and the Post Yard (1825–31), Palladian wooden buildings of the Branicki "Winter Palace" and, once, the District Nobility Assembly, prior to a fire. The Shukhov Water Tower, a tower that supports a water tank was built according to a project of Vladimir Shukhov, a Russian engineer-polymath, scientist and architect.

=== Religious buildings ===
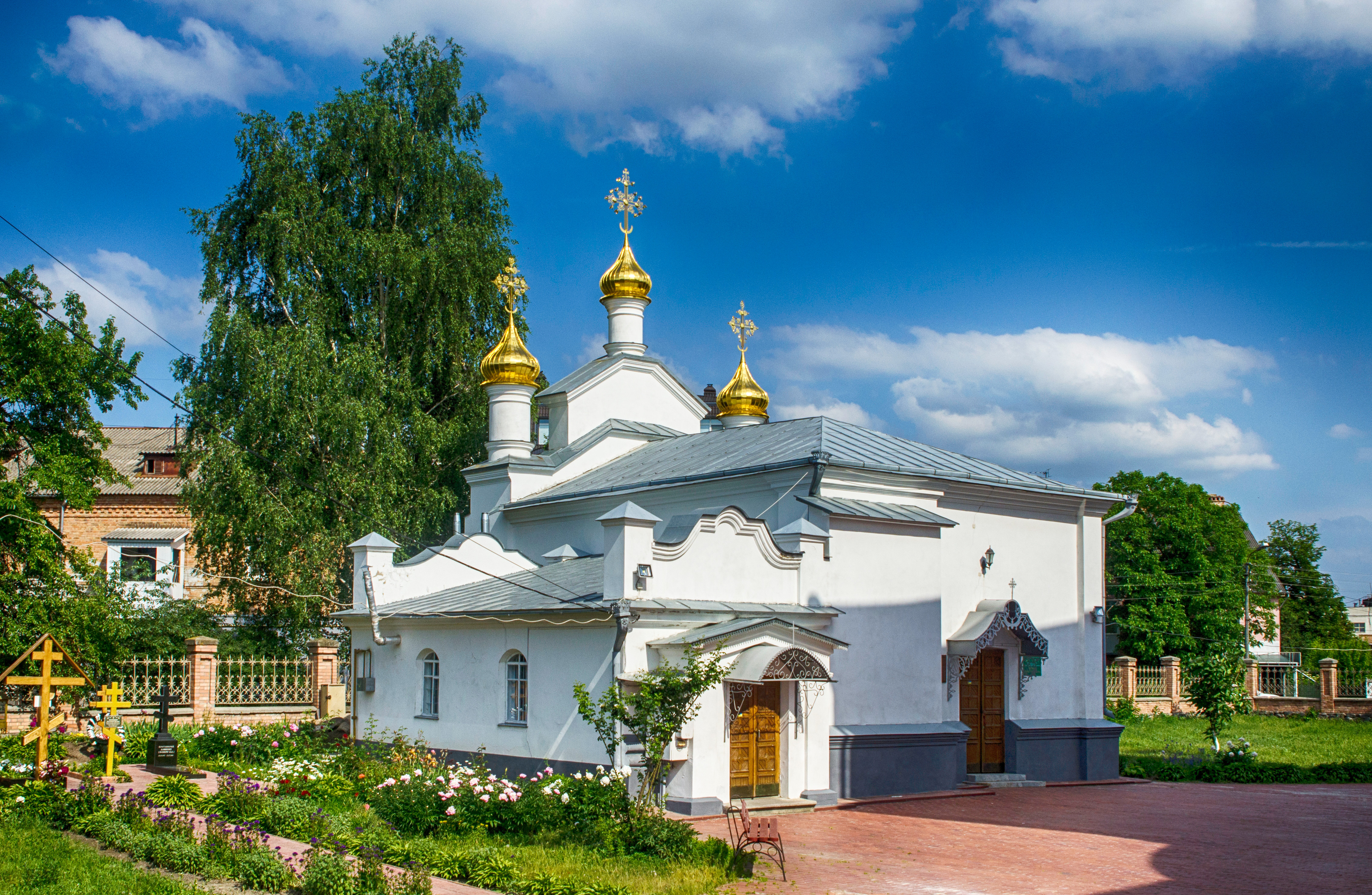
St Nicholas Church

The construction of St. Nicholas Church was begun in 1706 under Ukrainian Hetman Ivan Mazepa, but the building was not completed until 1852. The Orthodox Saviour's Transfiguration Cathedral was built between 1833 and 1839. The Roman Catholic St. John the Baptist Church dates to 1812. St. Mary Magdalene Church was completed in 1846 by Count Branicki. The building of the mid-19th century Great Choral Synagogue has survived. Today it is the Technology and Economic College of Bila Tserkva National Agrarian University. St. George the Victorious was recently rebuilt from ruins in the manner of an ancient 11–12th c. Ruthenian temple, on the foundation of the church destroyed by the Tatar-Mongols. It is said to be the white church that gave the city its name in a 14th c. homage to Yaroslav the Wise.

=== Synagogues ===
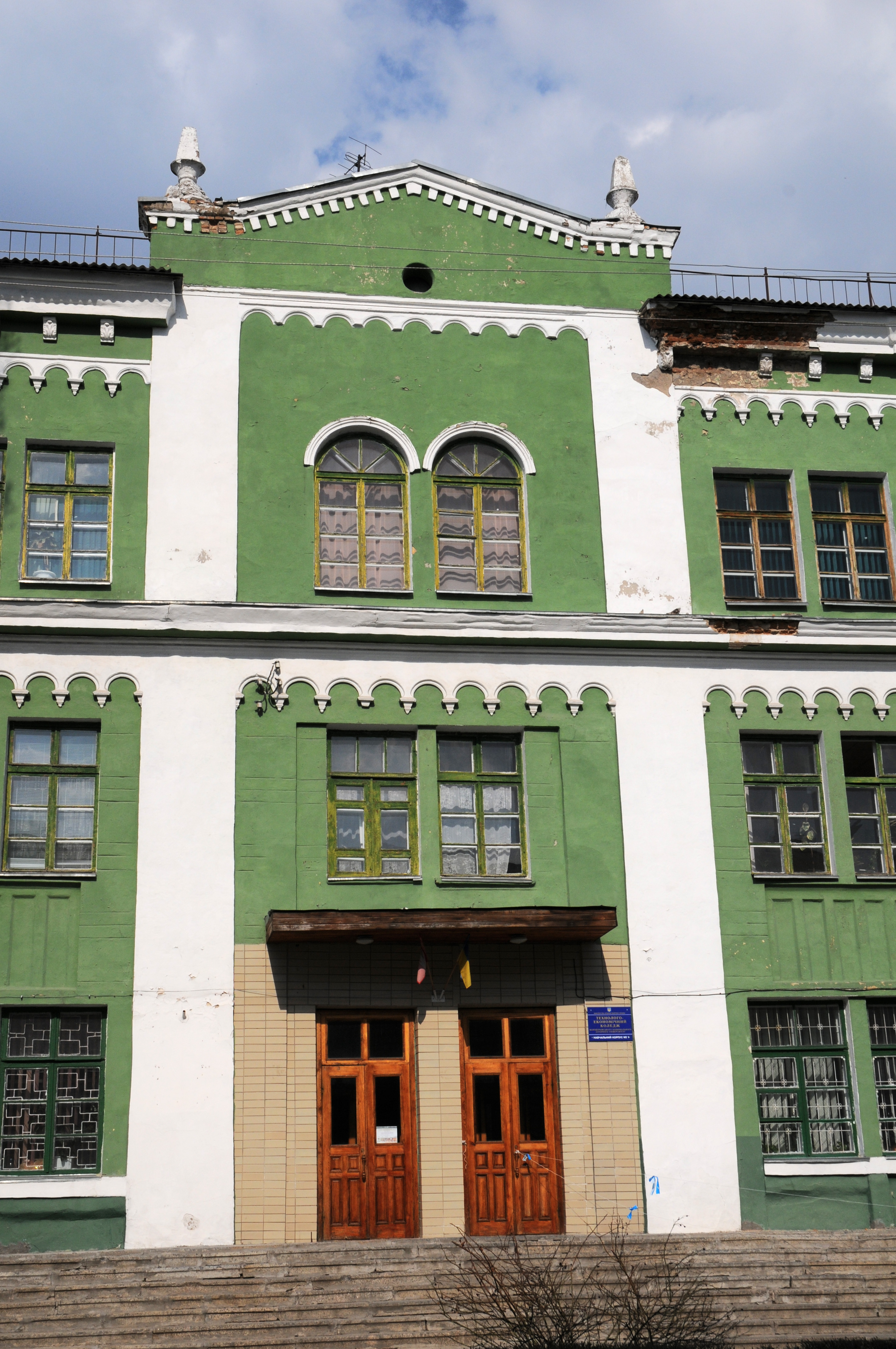
The mid-19th century (1854–1860) Great Choral Synagogue is now used as the Technology and Economic College of the National Agrarian University.

=== City sites ===
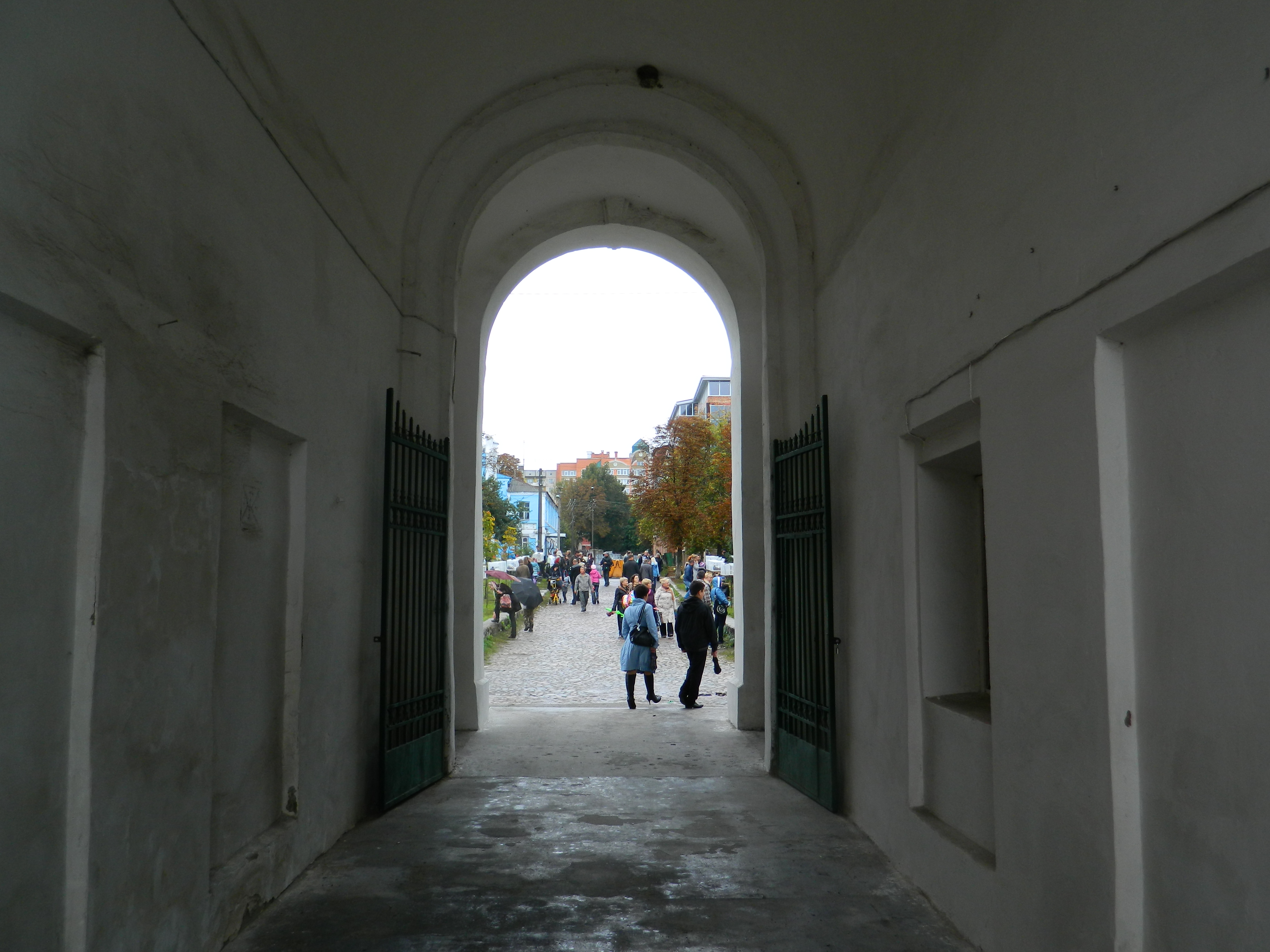
The arcades of the Merchant Court, interior, built in 1809–1814

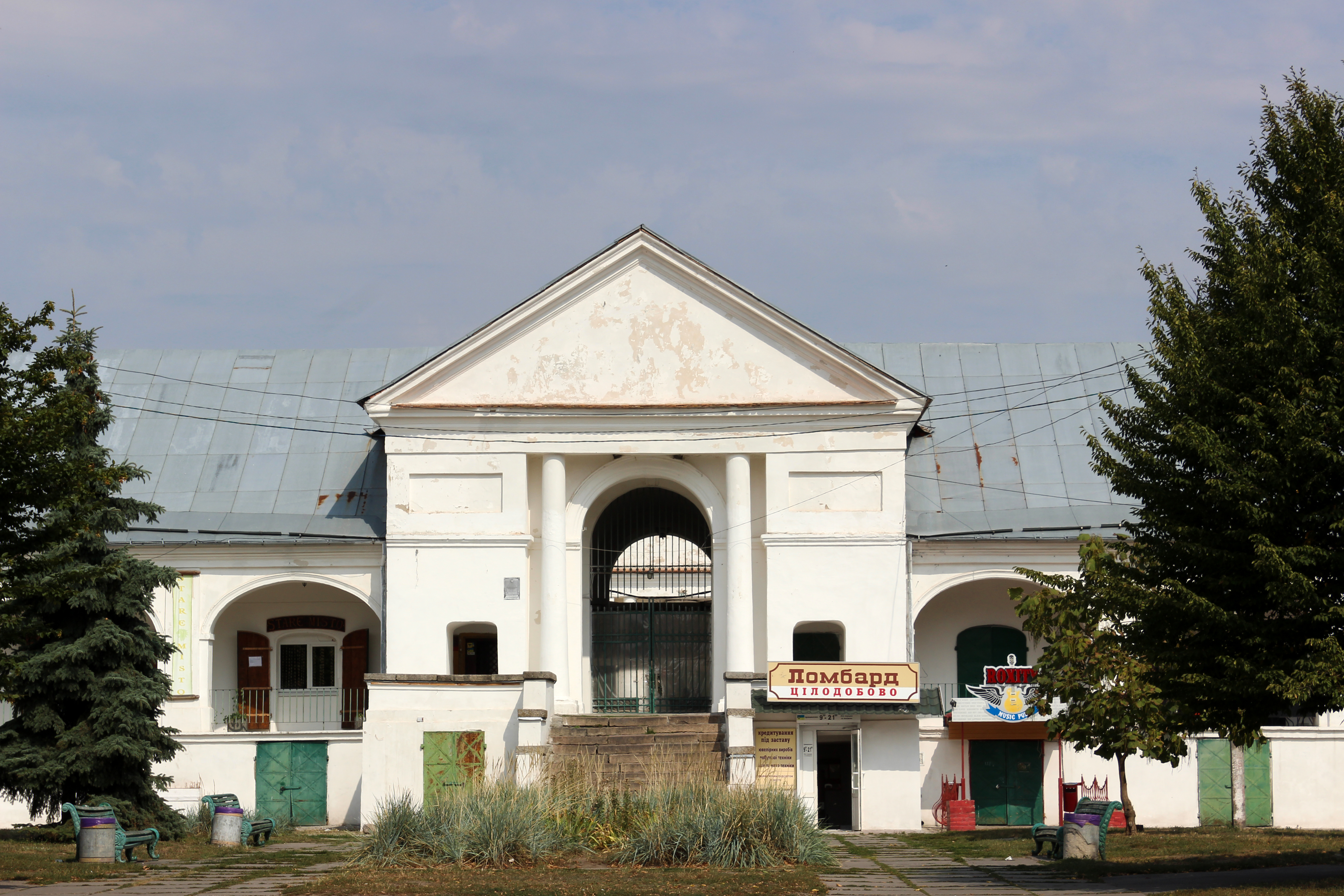
The main entrance to the recently revived Merchant Court, built in 1809–1814

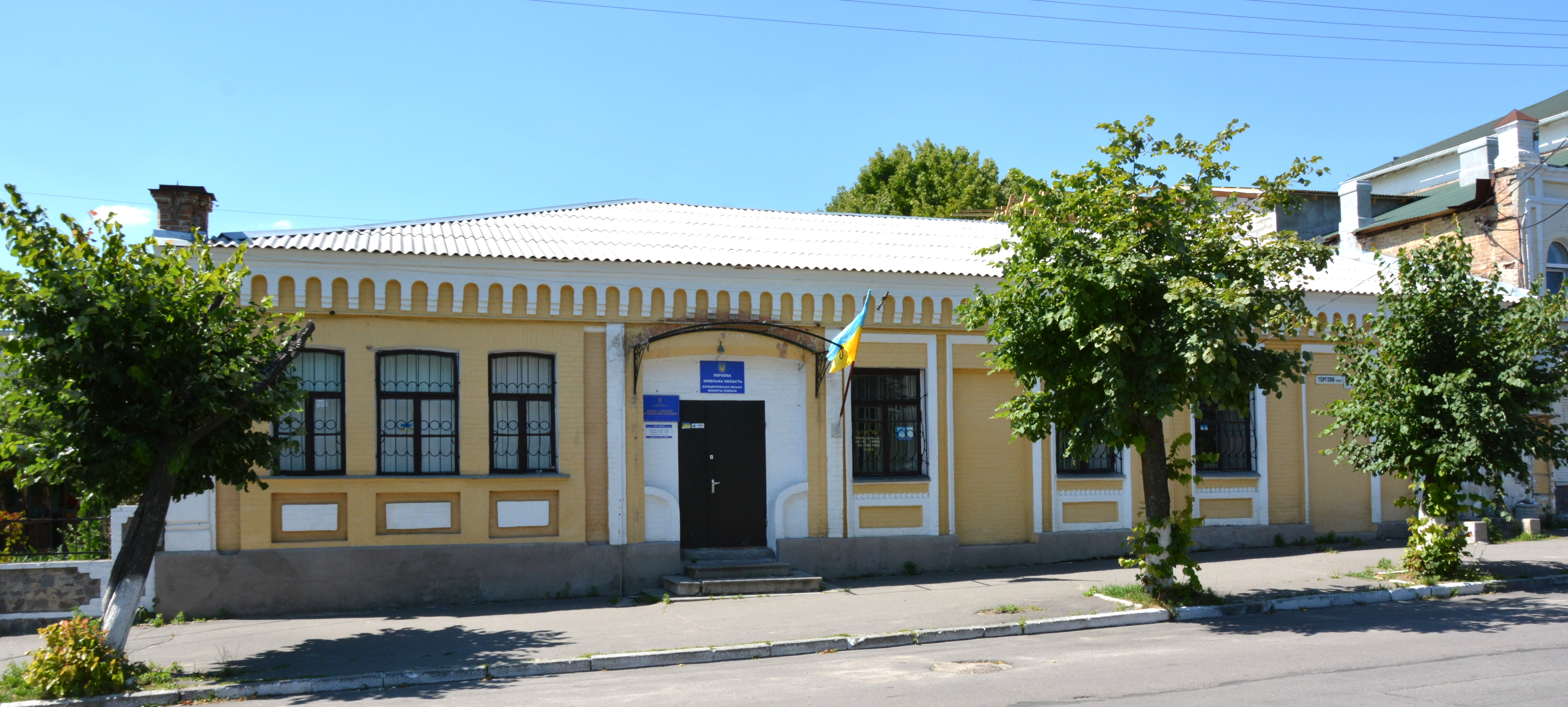
Square No. 6 is one of many alternate shopping centers.

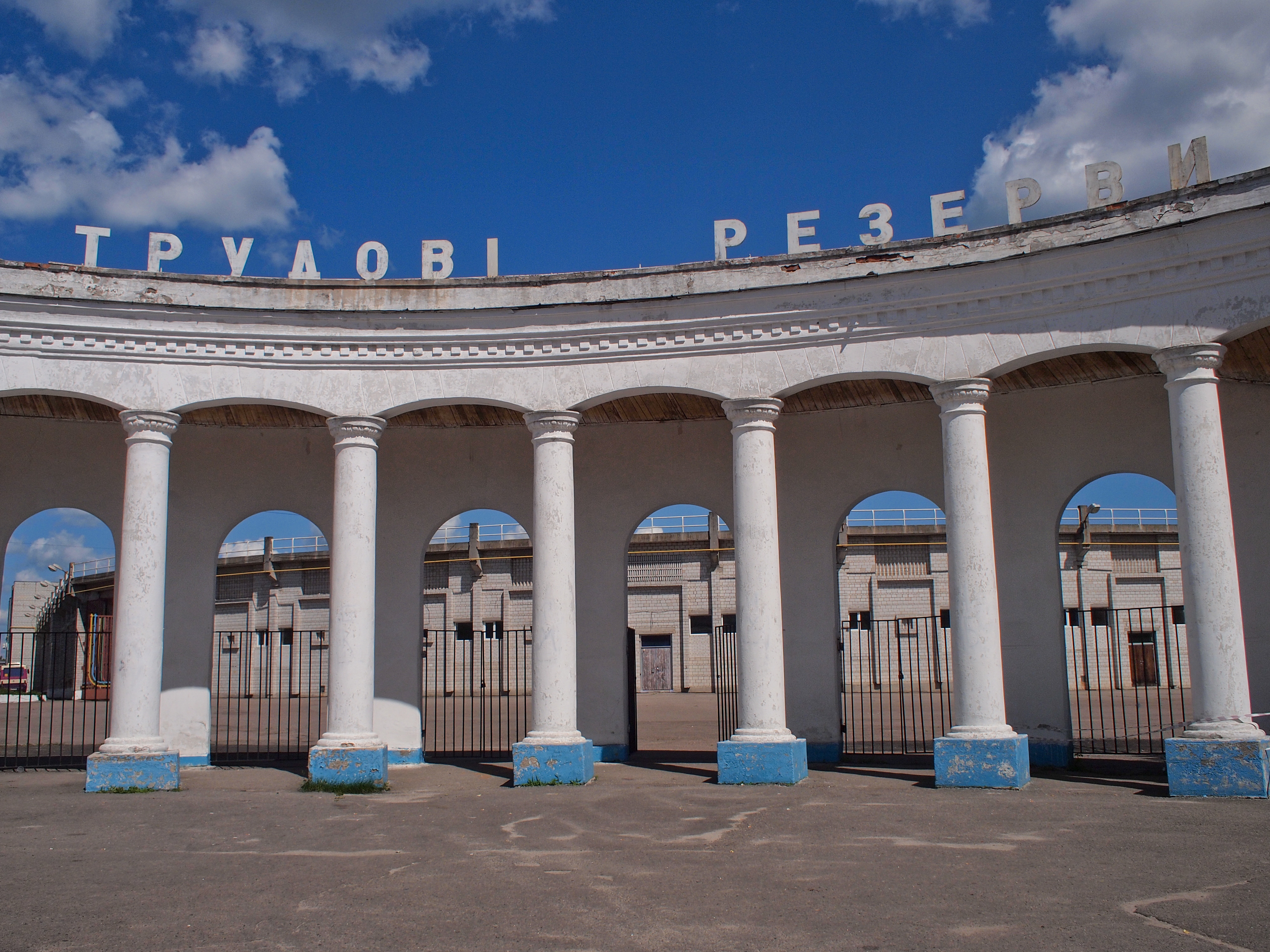
Entrance to the Labor Reserves Stadium

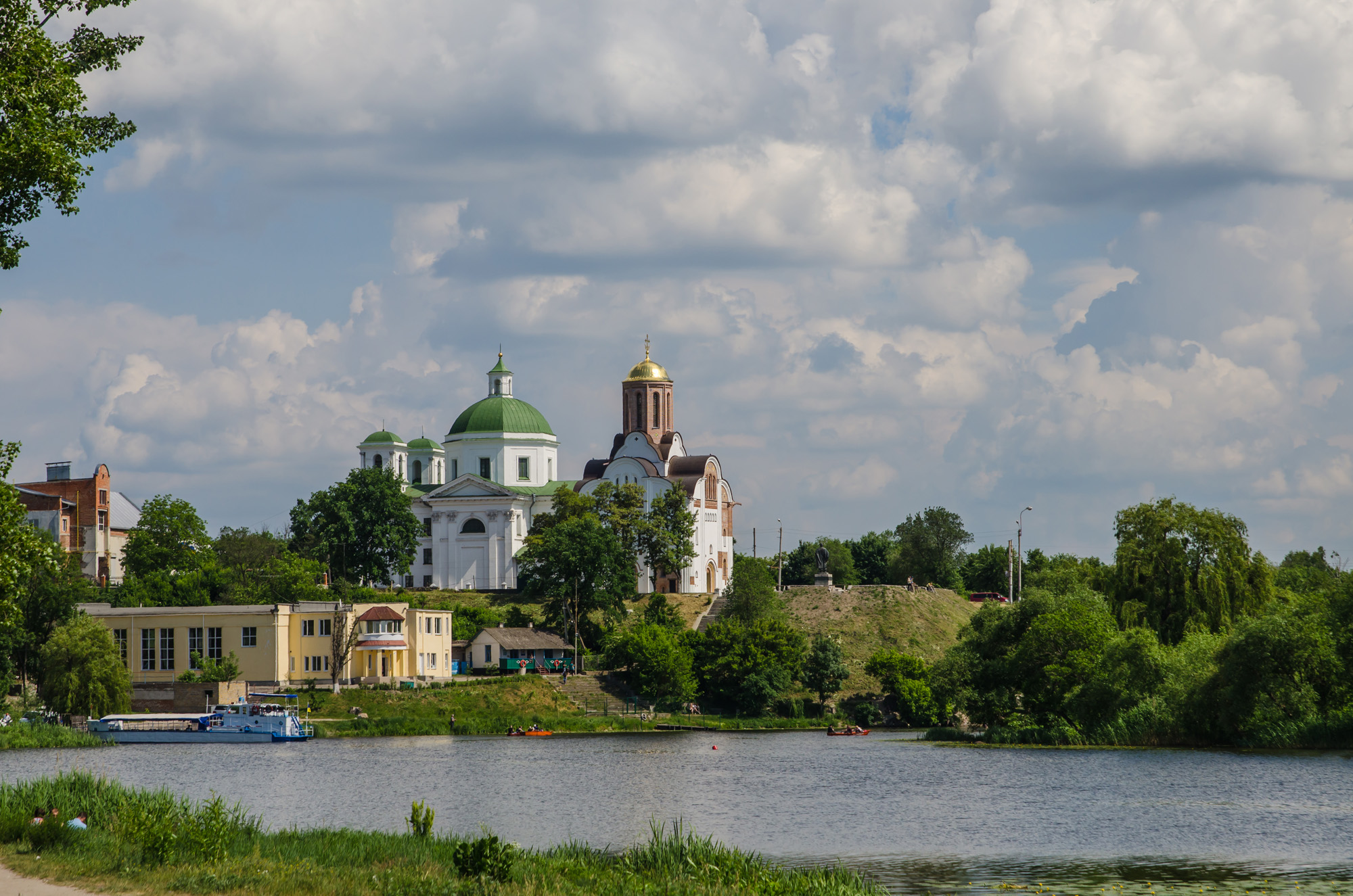
View from the Ros River to Castle Hill and the Church of St. John the Baptist

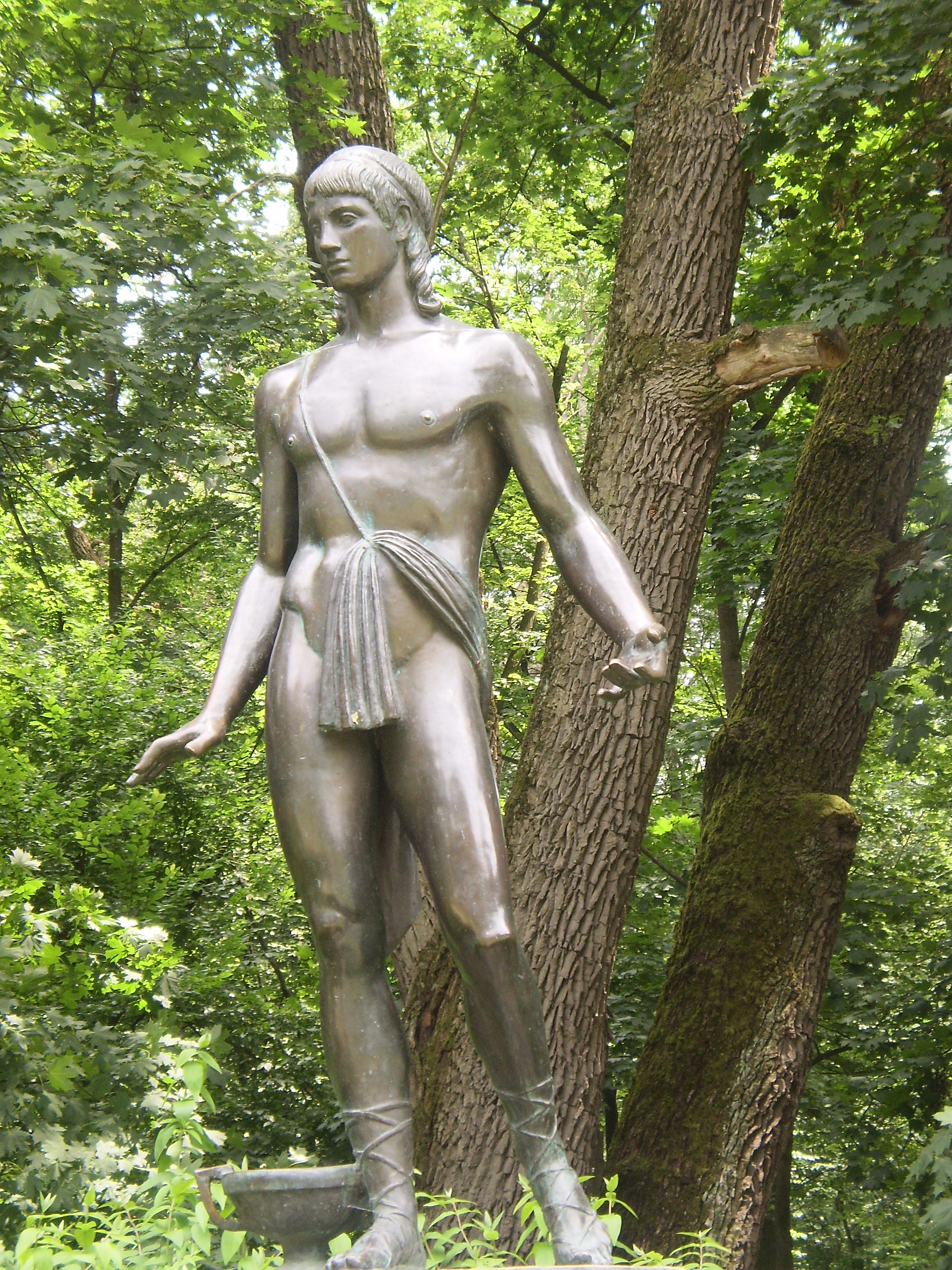
1793 statue adorning the 400-acre Oleksandriia Park

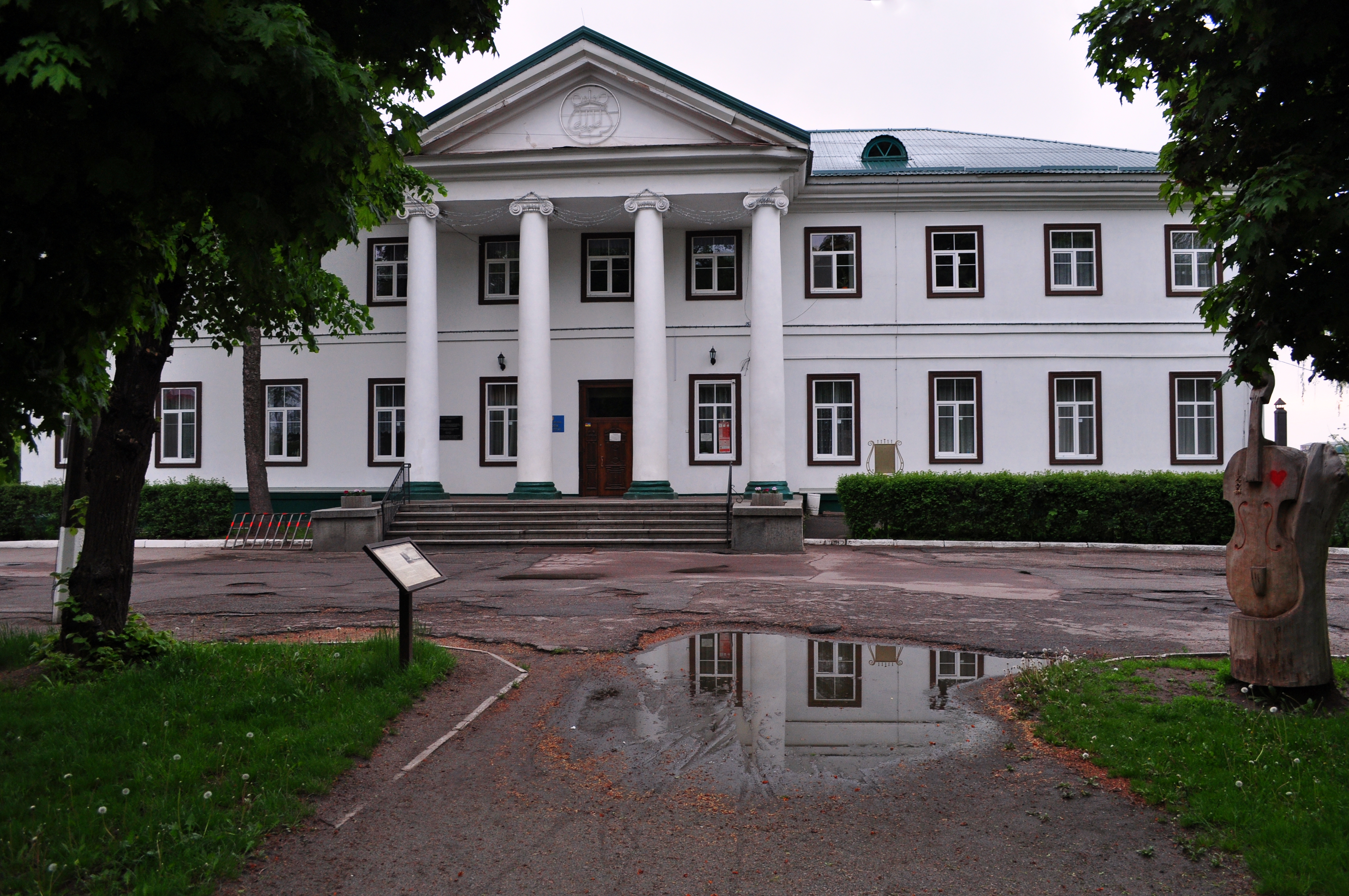
Branicki's Winter Palace was built in the Palladian style c. 1796.

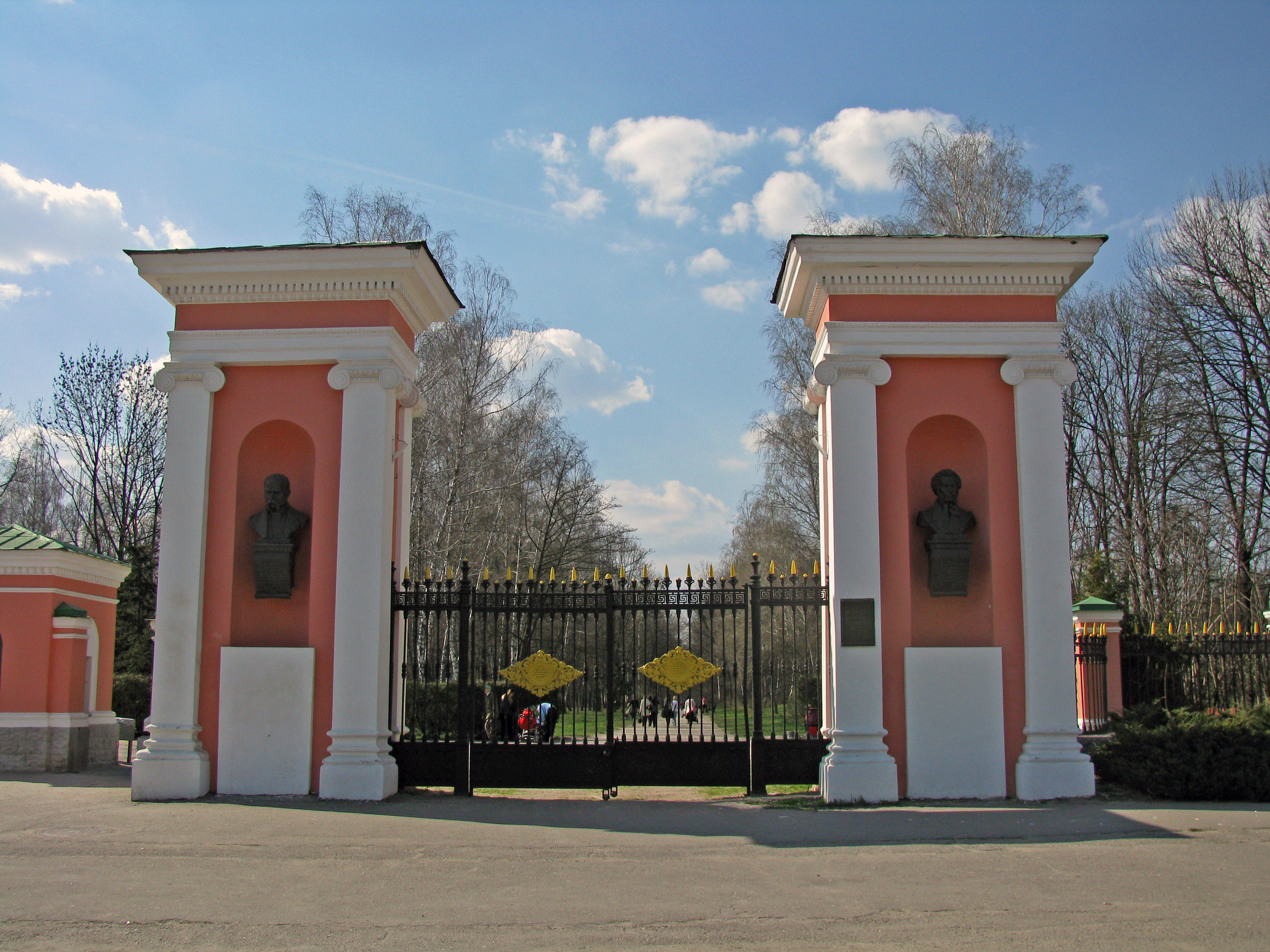
The entrance to Arboretum Oleksandriia

== Transportation ==
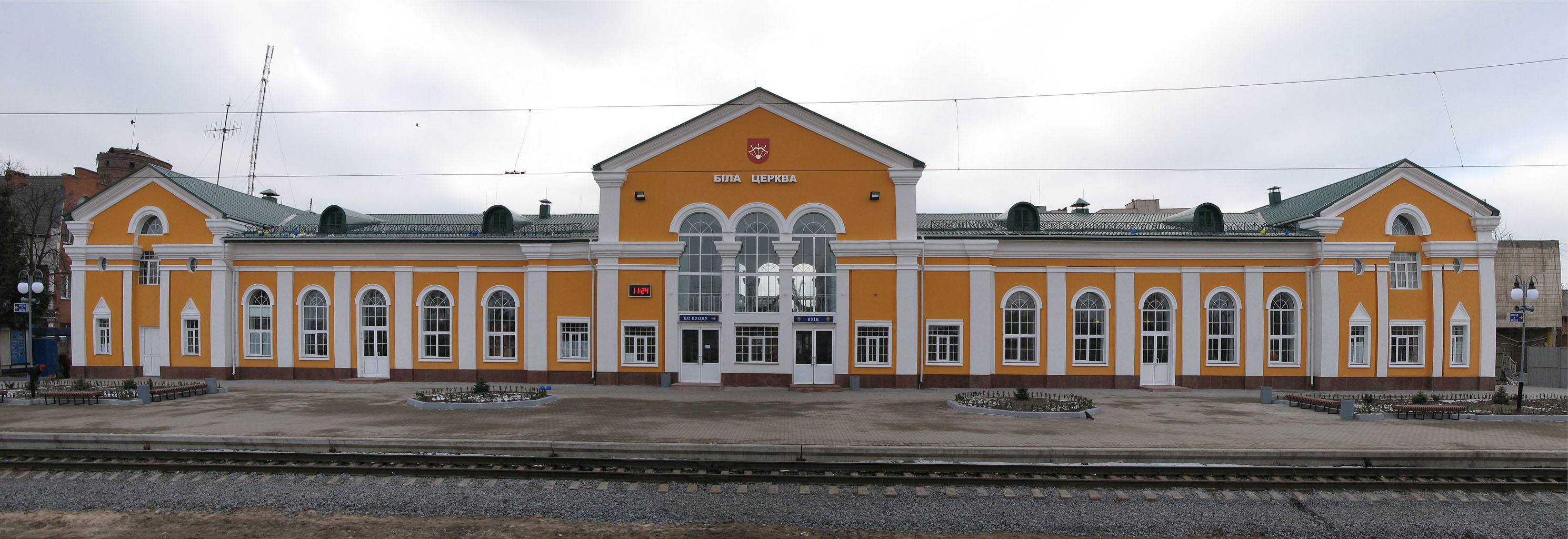
The entrance to the railway station

The M05 highway connects Bila Tserkva with Kyiv and Odesa.

The state-owned Ukrzaliznytsia provides railway links to the region and the rest of Ukraine. There are two railway stations in Bila Tserkva, Bila Tserkva railway station and Rotok railway station

The Bila Tserkva trolley service has six lines.

== Notable people ==
- David Bronstein (1924–2006) – leading chess grandmaster and writer
- Mother Elżbieta Róża Czacka (1876–1961) – philanthropist and nun, born in Bila Tserkva, and beatified in 2021
- Eugene Deslaw (1898–1966) – avant-garde French cinema director, also known for introducing the Boy Scouts to Ukraine
- Artur Valeryevich Dmitriev (1968–2026) – two-time Russian Olympic champion, born in Bila Tserkva
- Luka Dolinski (1750–1830) – painter, representative of the late Ukrainian Baroque, Rococo and Classicism, educated at the Academy of Fine Arts Vienna
- Vitalii Dribnytsia (born 1965), historian, history teacher, co-author of school books and YouTuber
- Volodymyr Dyudya (born 1983) – professional Ukrainian cyclist
- Kostyantyn Efymenko (born 1975) – president of Biofarma, Chairman of Tribo
- Mikhail Eisenstein (1867-1920, born as Moisey Eisenstein) - civil engineer, designer many of the best-known Art Nouveau buildings of Riga, Latvia, and the father of Soviet film director Sergei Eisenstein
- David Goodman, father of Benny Goodman – American jazz and swing musician, clarinetist and bandleader; widely known as the "King of Swing"
- Axel Firsoff (1910–1981) – British astronomer, born in Bila Tserkva
- Boris Samoilovich Iampol'skii (1912–1972) – Russian-language writer
- Andrzej Klimowicz (1918–1996) – operative for Zegota, the government-supported resistance group, organized to help Jews in Nazi-occupied Poland. They are said to have saved tens of thousands from 1942 to 1945.
- Les Kurbas (1887–1937) – movie and theater director, co-founder of Soviet theater avant-garde and a prominent figure of the Executed Renaissance
- Yuri Linnik (1915–1972) – Soviet mathematician
- Tetiana Husarchuk (born 1957) – Ukrainian musicologist
- Ivan Mazepa (1639–1709) – Hetman of Zaporizhian Host from 1687 to 1708
- Olexandr Medvid' (born 1937) – Soviet Belarusian wrestler
- Halyna Nevinchana (born 1957) – painter, writer, journalist
- Ivan Nechuy-Levytsky (1838–1918) – writer, ethnographer, folklorist, teacher
- Lyudmila Pavlichenko (1916–1974) – World War II Soviet sniper. Credited with 309 kills, she is regarded as one of the top military snipers of all time and the most successful female sniper in history.
- Pavlo Popovich (1930–2009) – Soviet astronaut, fourth ever person in outer space, twice Hero of the Soviet Union
- Yossele Rosenblatt (1882–1933) – American cantor
- Shaye Shkarovsky (1891–1945) – Yiddish author
- Yaakov Steinberg (1887–1947) – Yiddish and Hebrew short-story writer, essayist, critic, and translator
- Mikhael Sukernik (1902–1981) – Soviet Russian-Ukrainian chemist who contributed to the development and publication of a Russian-Yiddish dictionary published in 1984
- Marina Trattner, Swedish lawyer and journalist of Ukrainian descent, an archivist, public figure, and popularizer of history

== Sister cities ==
- Tarnów, Poland
- Ostrowiec Świętokrzyski, Poland
- Jingzhou, China
- Kaunas, Lithuania
- Kremenchuk, Ukraine
- Braunschweig, Germany

== See also ==
- Arboretum Oleksandriya
- Bela Crkva, Banat
- Battle of Bila Tserkva (1651)
- Bila Tserkva Massacre
- Bila Tserkva Raion
- Bila Tserkva Regiment
- Bila Tserkva Together
- Great Choral Synagogue
- Kyiv Oblast
- Treaty of Bila Tserkva
