= Vilshana, Sumy Oblast =

Village in Sumy Oblast, Ukraine

Vilshana Вільшана
- Village
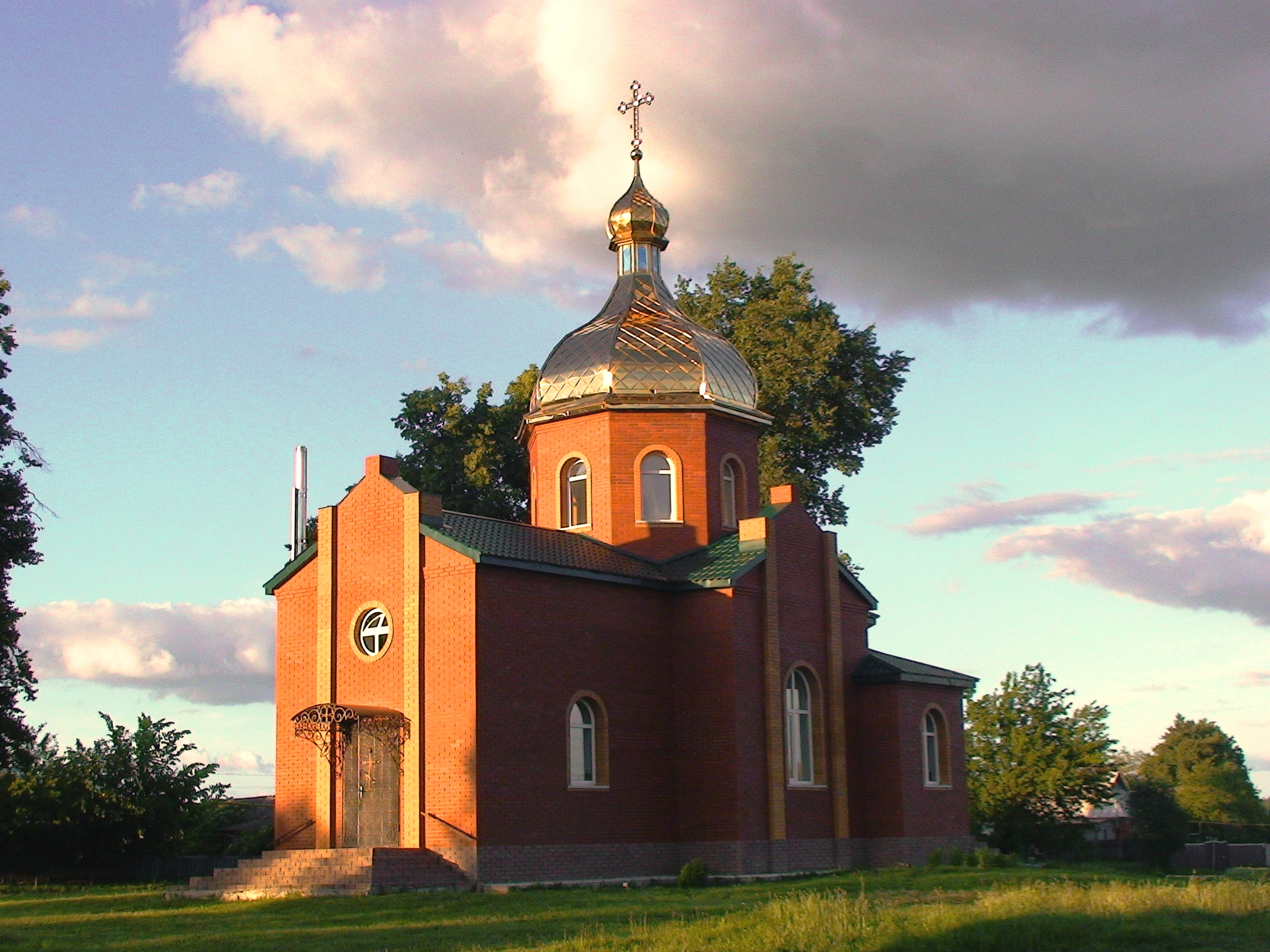
- Saint Michael Church in Vilshana

- Location of Vilshana in Sumy Oblast Location of Vilshana in Ukraine
- Coordinates: 50°48′50″N 34°02′06″E
- Country: Ukraine
- Oblast: Sumy Oblast
- Raion: Romny Raion
- Hromada: Vilshana rural hromada
- First mentioned: 1609

Population
  - Total: 1,895

Vilshana (Ukrainian: Вільшана) is a village in Romny Raion, in the central Sumy Oblast of Ukraine. It is the administrative centre of Vilshana rural hromada, one of the hromadas of Ukraine. Its population is 1,895 (as of 2024).

== History ==
Vilshana was first mentioned in 1609. At the time, it was known as Olshannaia (Ukrainian: Ольшанная). At various points, the village has also been known as Olshana (Ukrainian: Ольшана) and Vilshanka (Ukrainian: Вільшанка). According to popular local legend, the name is descended from the word "волю шанувати" (Voliu shanuvaty), meaning "respect for freedom", and was founded by Cossacks. Another local legend says that it was named for the Vilshanka.

Vilshana was occupied by the Russian Soviet Federative Socialist Republic in January 1918. Afterwards, the Lenin kolkhoz was established in the village, focusing on beef and milk production. During World War II a partisan movement briefly existed within the village from September to December 1941, led by A. K. Kalynychenko. 300 residents died during the war, and in 1967 a monument to Soviet soldiers was erected in Vilshana.

== Notable people ==
- Vasyl Rybalko, Red Army starshina.
