= Kyiv International University =

Private university in Kyiv, Ukraine

- Київський міжнародний університет
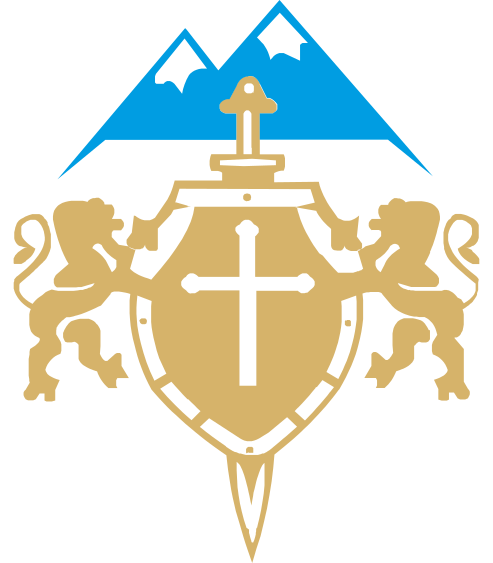
- Established: 1994
- Accreditation: Ministry of Education and Science of Ukraine
- Address: Kiev, st. Lviv, 49 Avalanche of Vernadsky, 16 V Mykola Rudenko Boulevard, 15 V 50.4531°N 30.3548°E
- Website: www.kymu.edu.ua

The Kyiv International University (Ukrainian: Київський міжнародний університет, romanized: Kyïvskyĭ mizhnarodnyĭ universytet) is a private university in Kyiv, Ukraine, founded in 1994. Originally it was called the International Institute of Linguistics and Law, and in 2002 was renamed Kyiv International University. Today KIU has nearly 5,000 students. The academic staff of KIU includes 65 Doctors of Sciences, Professors, 148 Candidates of Sciences, Associate Professors.

== Structure ==
=== Institutes and facilities ===
- Institute of International Relations (International Law; International relations, social communication and regional studios; International Economic Relations; Politology; Tourism);
- Institute of Journalism, Film and Television (Journalism; Audiovisual arts and production);
- Institute Theater Arts (Performing Arts);
- Institute of Linguistics and Psychology (Philology (English); Psychology; Education sciences; Secondary education (English));
- Institute of Law (Law);
- Medical Institute (Nursing; Medicine);
- Faculty of Economics (Management; Finance, banking and insurance; Economics; Business, trade and exchange activities; Public administration);
- Faculty of Building and Architecture (Building and civil engineering; Architecture and town planning);
- Faculty of Information Technologies (Computer Science);
- Pharmaceutical Faculty (Pharmacy);
- Stomatological Faculty (Dentistry).

=== Departments ===
- Department of Slavonic Philology and General Linguistics;
- Department of Foreign Languages;
- Department of Germanic languages and translation;
- Department of Audiovisual Arts and Productions;
- Department of Construction and Architecture;
- Department of Economics, Management, Business;
- Department of Computer Science;
- Department of International Relations and Tourism;
- Department of International Law and Comparative Law;
- Department of Psychology and Pedagogy;
- Department of Public-Law Disciplines;
- Department of Social Communications;
- Department of Dentistry;
- Department of surgical, orthopedic dentistry and orthodontics;
- Department of Performing Arts;
- Department of Theoretical and Private-Law Disciplines;
- Department of Theory and History of Journalism;
- Department of Quality Standardization of Medicine;
- Department of Pharmacy;
- Department of General Medicine;
- Department of Clinical Disciplines and Nursing.
