= Zygmunt Krasiński Square =

Public garden in Wrocław, Poland

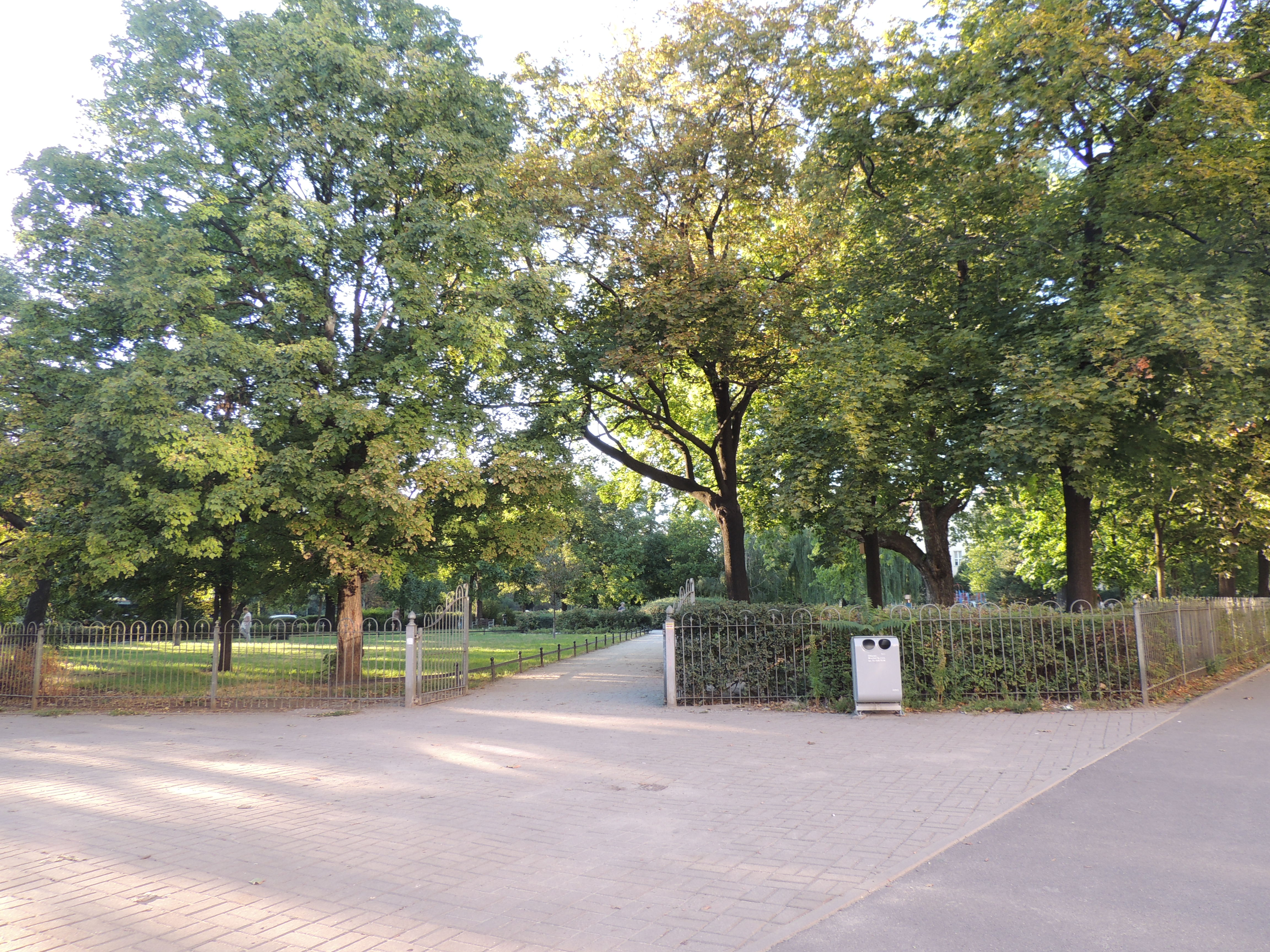
- South-eastern entrance

- Location within Poland
- Type: Garden square
- Location: Wrocław, Lower Silesian Voivodeship, Poland
- Coordinates: 51°06′16.507″N 17°02′30.621″E
- Area: 12,725 m^{2} (136,970 sq ft)
- Created: 1888
- Designer: H. Richter

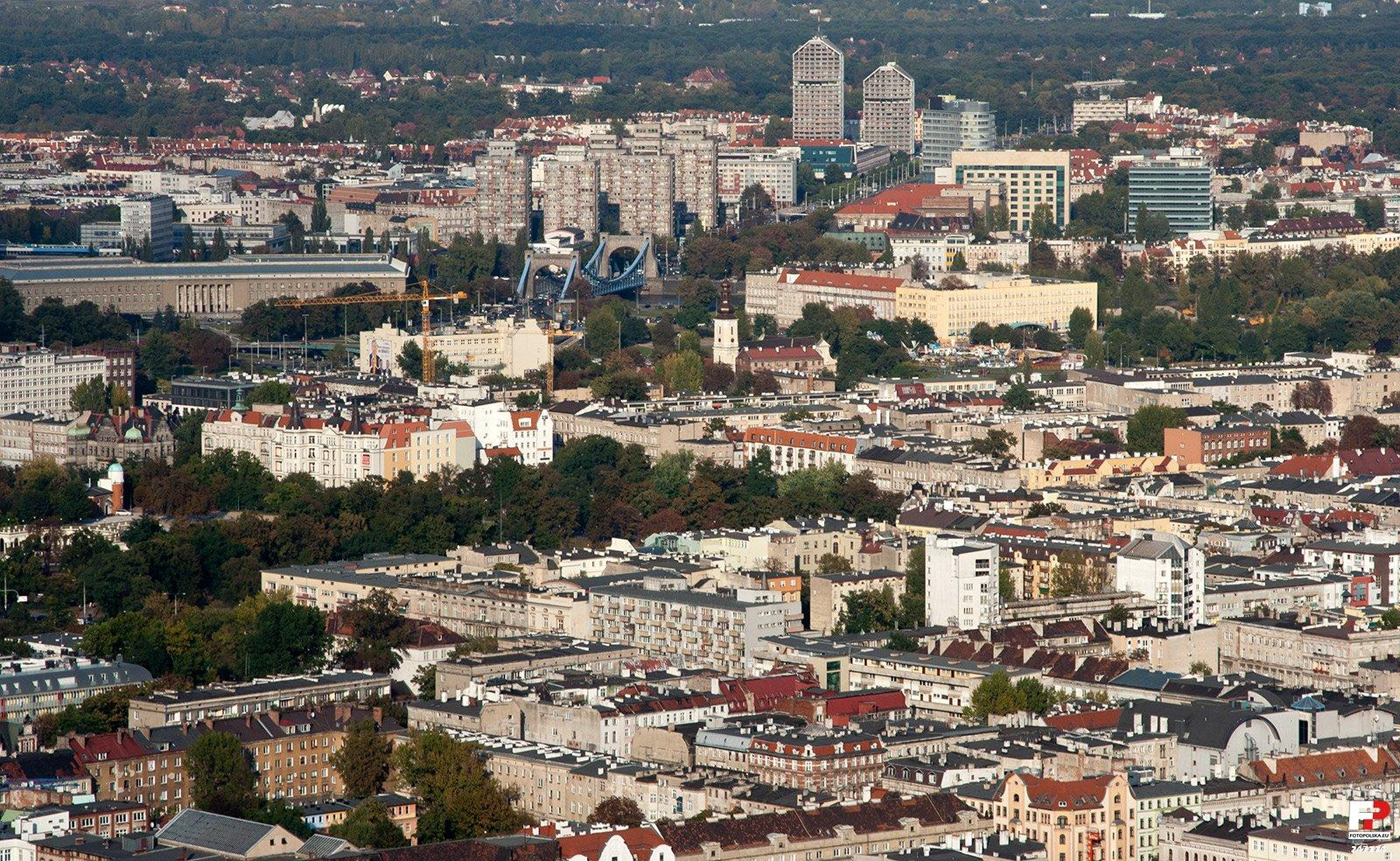
Przedmieście Oławskie, with the square in the central part

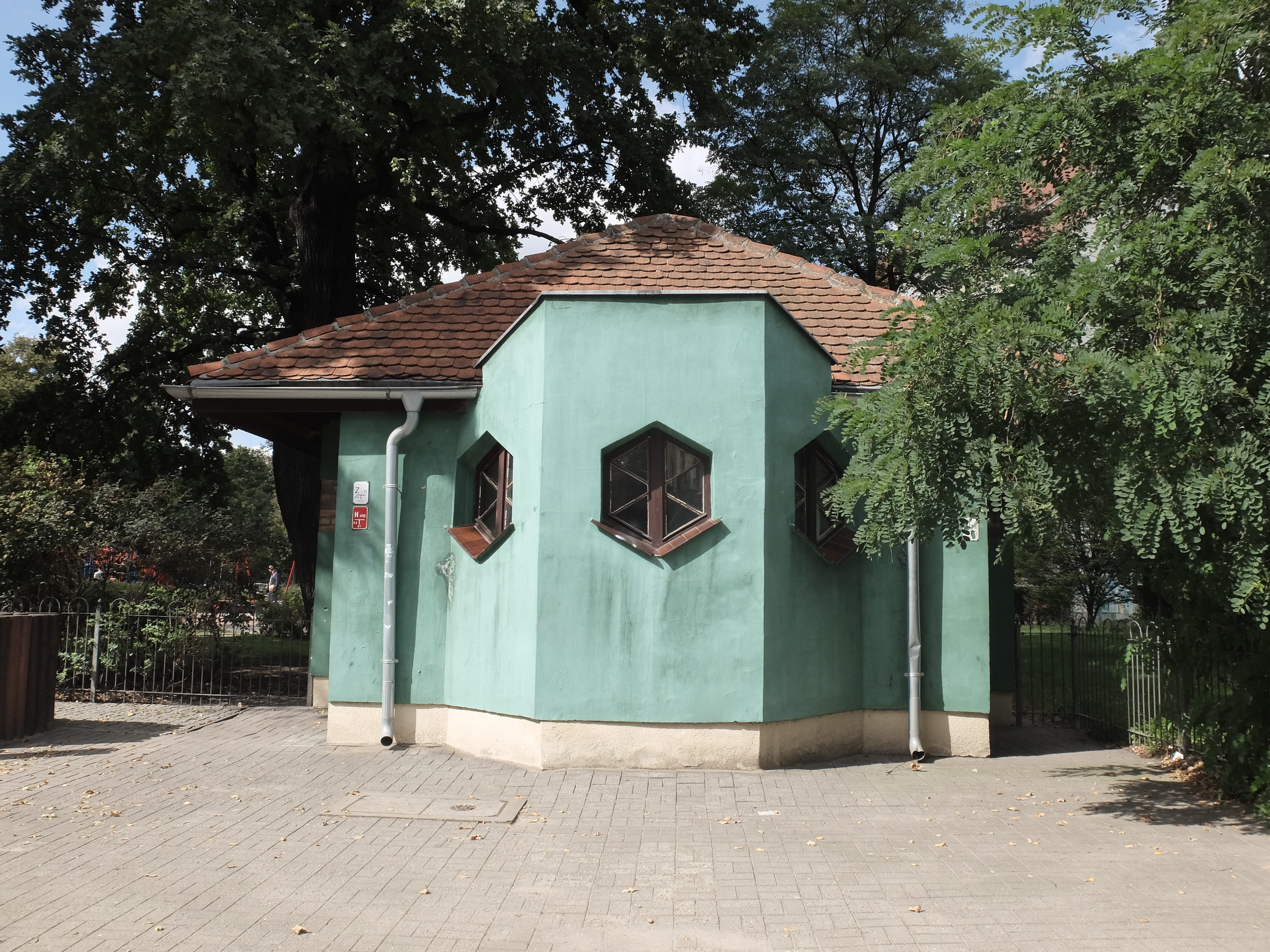
Public toilet building

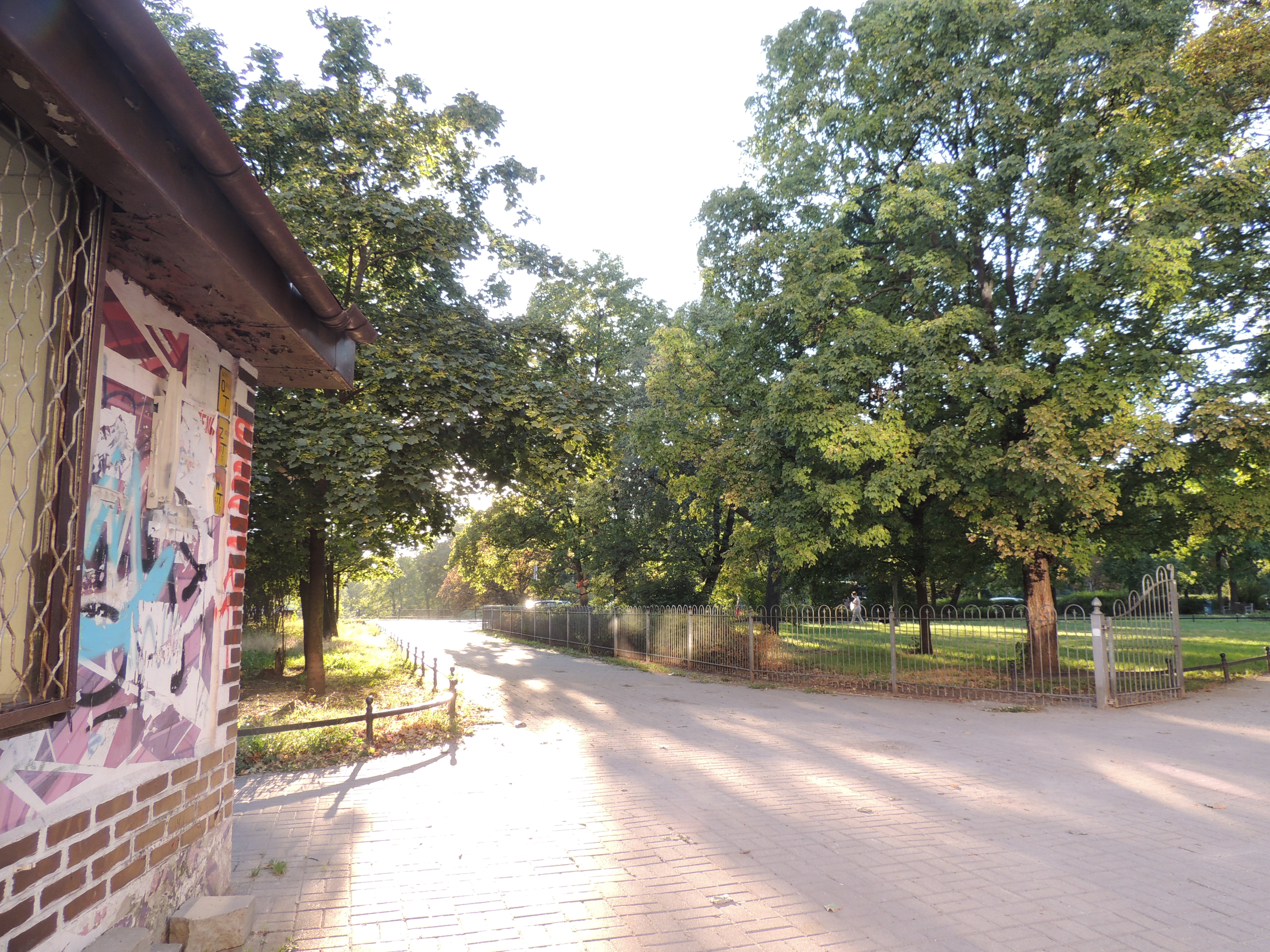
Kiosk and pathway from Zygmunt Krasiński Street to Podwale Street

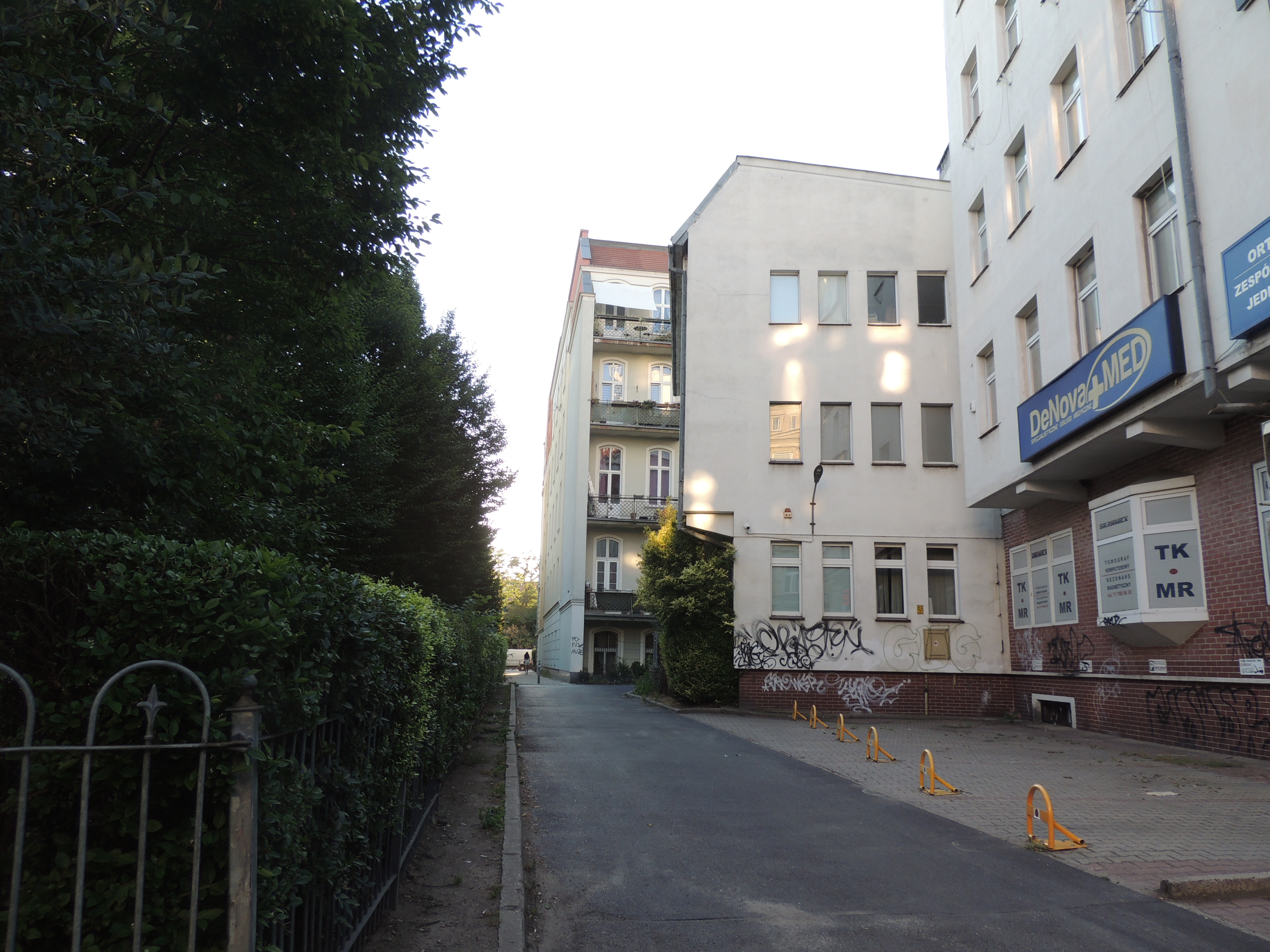
Northern boundary of the square, passage from Zygmunt Krasiński Street to Podwale Street

Zygmunt Krasiński Square is a public garden square located in the Przedmieście Oławskie district of Wrocław, Poland. It is situated within the boundaries of Podwale, Komuny Paryskiej, and Zygmunt Krasiński streets, and a block of downtown buildings to the north extending to Romuald Traugutt Street. Covering an area of 12,725 m^{2} (136,970 sq ft), the square was established in 1888 on the site of former cemeteries. Designed by H. Richter in 1892, it has undergone several modernisations, with a major restoration in 2000. Recognised as an important green space in the densely built-up district, it is protected under the Registry of Cultural Property.

== History ==
The square is located in an area historically part of the fortified forefield of Wrocław's Old Town, known as Przedmieście Oławskie (Ohlauer Vorstadt). Following the demolition of the city's fortifications in 1807, this area was incorporated into Wrocław in 1808.

In 1777, the first cemetery was established there, followed by others. From north to south, these included three Protestant cemeteries – St. Bernardine (until 1868), St. Christopher (until 1891), and Saviour (until 1867) – and the Catholic St. Dorothy Cemetery (1816–1861). As the cemeteries were gradually decommissioned starting in 1888, the land was repurposed into a square. Initially, it included a playground for children. In 1892, H. Richter designed it as a recreational and promenade space, preserving 28 gravestones and post-cemetery old trees. The square was modernised several times before 1945. A remnant of the necropolis persisted until 1901 near Komuny Paryskiej Street, numbers 2 to 6.

In 2000, the square underwent a comprehensive restoration.

== Names ==
Throughout its history, the square has been known by the following names:

- Spielplatz (Playground)
- Zygmunt Krasiński Square

The current name was assigned by a resolution of the Wrocław City Council on 9 October 1993 (No. LXXI/454/93), effective from 1 January 1994. It commemorates Zygmunt Krasiński (1812–1859), a poet, playwright, novelist, and letter writer of the Romantic era, known for works such as The Undivine Comedy and Irydion.

The street bordering the square to the east was named after Zygmunt Krasiński by the Municipal Board on 15 November 1945. On 23 October 2021, new bus stops named "Skwer Krasińskiego" were opened: one on Zygmunt Krasiński Street past the intersection with Komuny Paryskiej Street, and another on Podwale Street before the intersection with Komuny Paryskiej Street.

== Location and surroundings ==
Zygmunt Krasiński Square is located in the Przedmieście Oławskie district. This area forms part of Wrocław's downtown zone, a central area densely filled with urban fabric, characterised by mixed residential and other functions, primarily residential-service buildings.

The urban layout features a defined compositional structure with linear and block elements. It consists of city blocks arranged in quarters, with representative functions on the exterior and utilitarian functions within. The area features terraced, frontage buildings along streets, though with occasional gaps in the building line. The district has a dense street network and public transport lines. Buildings are medium-height, up to 25 m (82 ft), with a designated downtown zone allowing taller structures.

The square is directly surrounded by:

- To the west: Podwale Street, beyond which lies the City Moat, followed by the Old Town Promenade and Partisans Hill, part of the Old Town.
- To the south: Komuny Paryskiej Street, with the southern terraced buildings interrupted only by Aleksander Hercen Street.
- To the east: Zygmunt Krasiński Street, with the western terraced buildings interrupted only by Stanisław Worcell Street.
- To the north: A block of buildings extending to Romuald Traugutt Street.

== Area and layout ==
The square covers an area of 12,725 m^{2} (136,970 sq ft), or 12,721 m^{2} (136,930 sq ft). The cadastral plot is assigned the addresses 71–72 Podwale Street.

The square is enclosed by a low, openwork fence. The green space is tree-lined, with espaliers of primarily maple trees on the eastern and western sides. Relics of original plantings, including an oak and elm trees, remain in the northern and eastern sections. Ornamental plants are also present. Entrances to the green area are located at the southern corners and from the east, west, and north. The pathway layout forms a geometric composition with two central plazas and a perimeter path. A children's playground with a trellis is situated in the northern fenced area. The square's design ensures visual openness towards the Old Town Promenade and Partisans Hill.

Adjacent to the square on Zygmunt Krasiński Street is a single-storey public toilet building with a footprint of 54 m^{2} (580 sq ft), located on the same plot as the square. At the south-eastern corner, a commercial kiosk with a footprint of 13 m^{2} (140 sq ft) is situated.

== Significance and protection ==
Zygmunt Krasiński Square is recognised as a significant urban green space in the compact, central downtown zone.

The square lies within the Przedmieście Oławskie area, listed in the Registry of Cultural Property on 20 June 2005 under decision No. 538/A/05. The protected spatial layout, shaped from the 13th to 19th centuries, is the primary focus.

The square itself is included in the municipal register of historic monuments under the title "Cemeteries: St. Bernardine, St. Christopher, Saviour, and St. Dorothy, now Zygmunt Krasiński Square", and is subject to corresponding protection.

== See also ==
- History of Wrocław

== Bibliography ==
- Harasimowicz, Jan, ed. (2006). Encyklopedia Wrocławia [Wrocław Encyclopedia] (in Polish) (3rd ed.). Wrocław: Wydawnictwo Dolnośląskie. ISBN 83-7384-561-5.
