= Pornocrates =

Watercolor painting by Félicien Rops

- Pornokratès, La dame au cochon
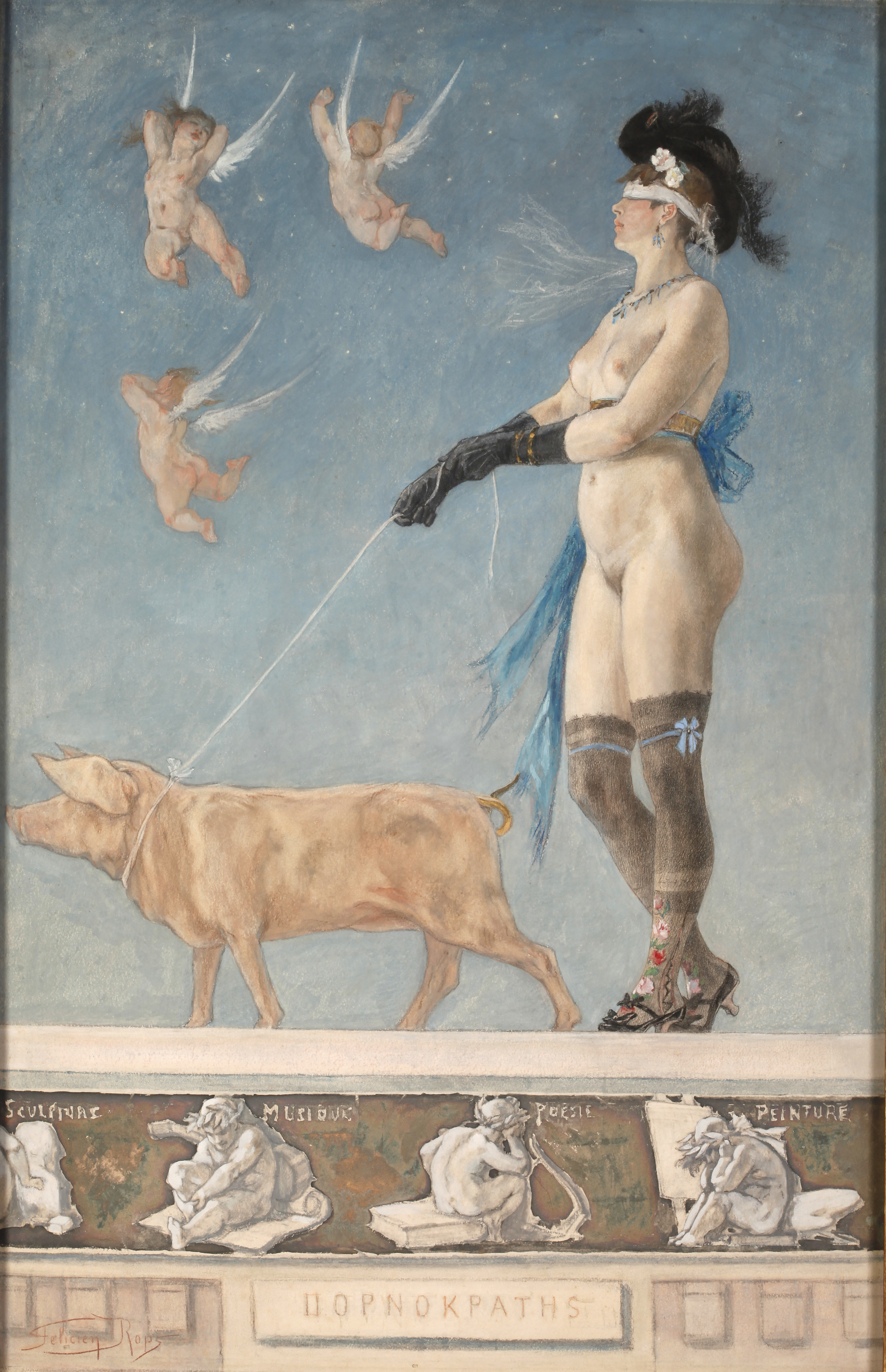
- Artist: Félicien Rops
- Year: 1878
- Type: Gouache and watercolor painting
- Dimensions: 75 cm × 48 cm (30 in × 19 in)
- Location: Musée provincial Félicien Rops, Namur

Pornocrates, Pornokratès, La dame au cochon, or The Lady with the Pig is an 1878 painting by the Belgian artist Félicien Rops. It is part of the collection of the Musée provincial Félicien Rops in Namur, Belgium.

The work is 75 cm high and 48 cm wide, executed in gouache and watercolor paint heightened with pastel on paper. Reproductions of the work (soft-ground etchings, heliogravures and aquatints, sometimes colored) are also held in other museum collections, such as the LACMA, the National Museum of Western Art and the Rijksmuseum Amsterdam.

== Description ==
Pornocrates is considered the best-known work by Rops. It was painted when Rops was 45 years old and living in Paris with Léontine Duluc and her sister Aurélie, with both of whom he fathered children. According to a letter by Rops, the painting was done "in an overheated apartment, full of different smells, where the opopanax and cyclamen gave me a slight fever conducive towards production or even towards reproduction". The work depicts a woman, holding a pig on a leash, viewed from the left side. The woman, said to be a courtesan, is almost naked, except for long black silk gloves, a blindfold, a plumed hat, black shoes and stockings, and a band of gold and blue silk – accessories which only emphasize her nakedness. Above the pig with golden tail, three winged putti fly away in what appears to be shock or horror. Rops refers to them as "Three loves – ancient loves – vanish in tears".

== Interpretation ==
Various interpretations of the work exist, the woman can be seen as a powerful female, led by the pig, which can be seen as an image of a man in a bestial, submissive and ignorant state, kept in check by the woman. The pig with golden tail can also be seen as an allegory for luxury, or even as an animal of the devil, a symbol of fornication, steering the woman in blindness. In any case, the work represents Rops' vision of the woman of his time: a femme fatale who was increasingly assertive, ruthless and seductive. "She was the human animal viciously depicted by Félicien Rops as "Pornokrates", ruler of Proudhon's "Pornocracy", a creature blindly guided by a hog, the symbol of Circe, the bestial representative of all sexual evil".

The woman and pig are walking on top of a marble stage, with a frieze depicting four allegories of the arts: sculpture, music, literature and painting. The fine arts are depicted as grey, classical male figures, looking desperate. This might be interpreted as the victory of sensuousness and eroticism of the art that Rops and his contemporaries of the Decadent movement created, in contrast with the boredom of the academic art of that era. An early owner of the work was the Belgian jurist and art collector Edmond Picard. Pornocrates was received with indignation and scandal during the 1886 exhibition of the Cercle des XX, an art group to which Rops belonged.

== Gallery ==
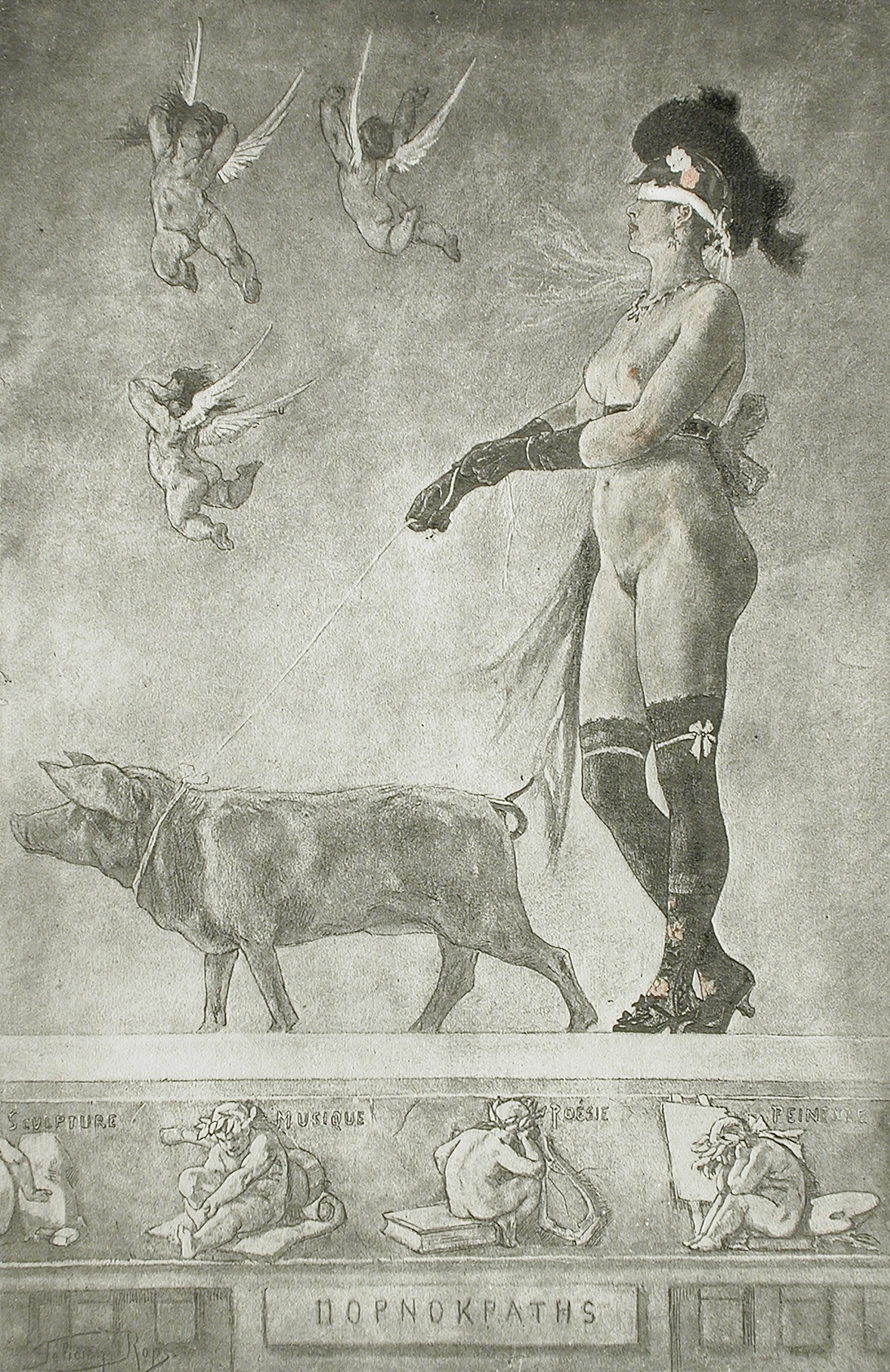
Soft-ground etching (1896) at LACMA

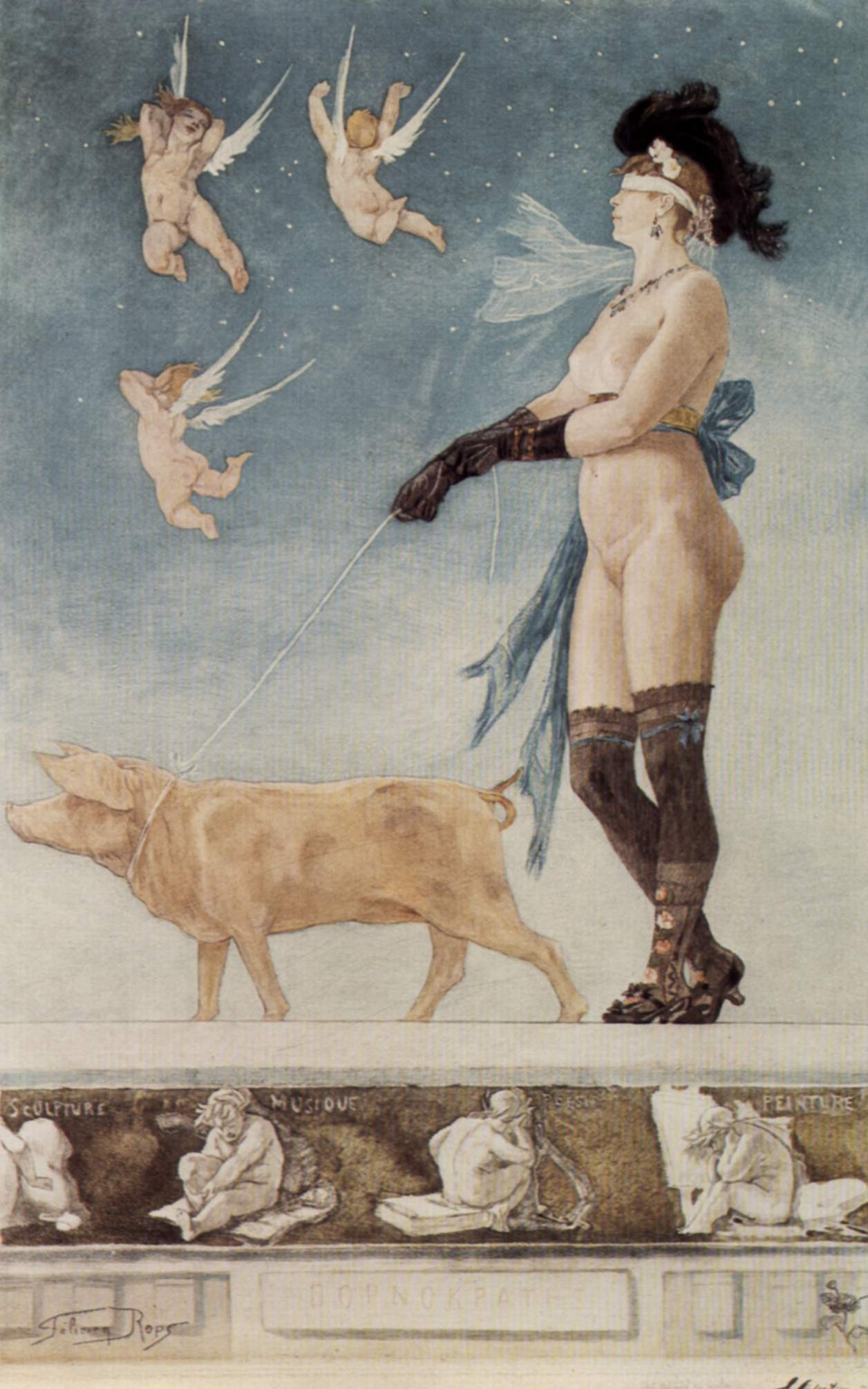
Etching with watercolours, private collection

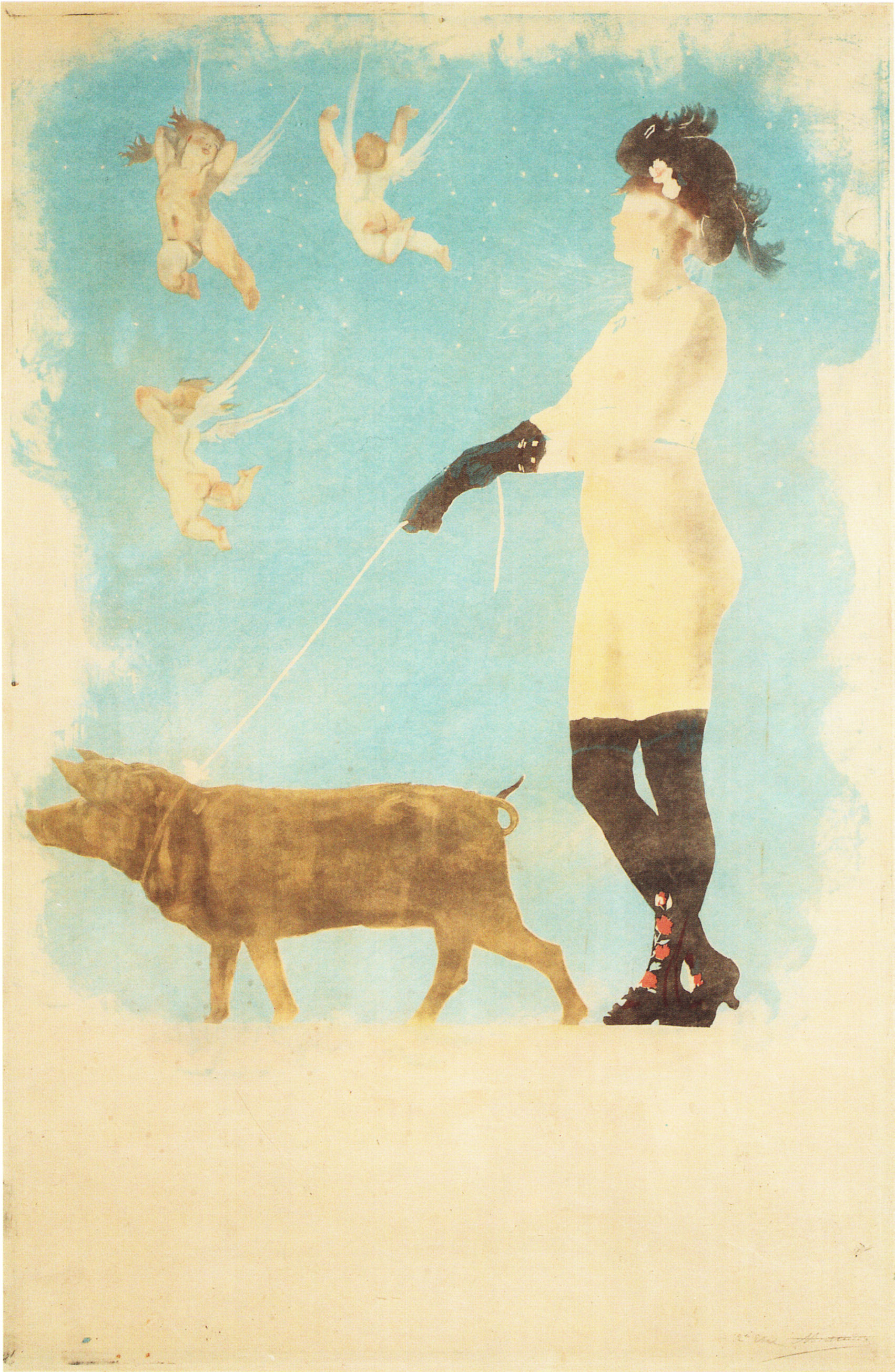
Photogravure (1896) at musée provincial Félicien Rops

== See also ==
- Roman decadence
