= Irydion =

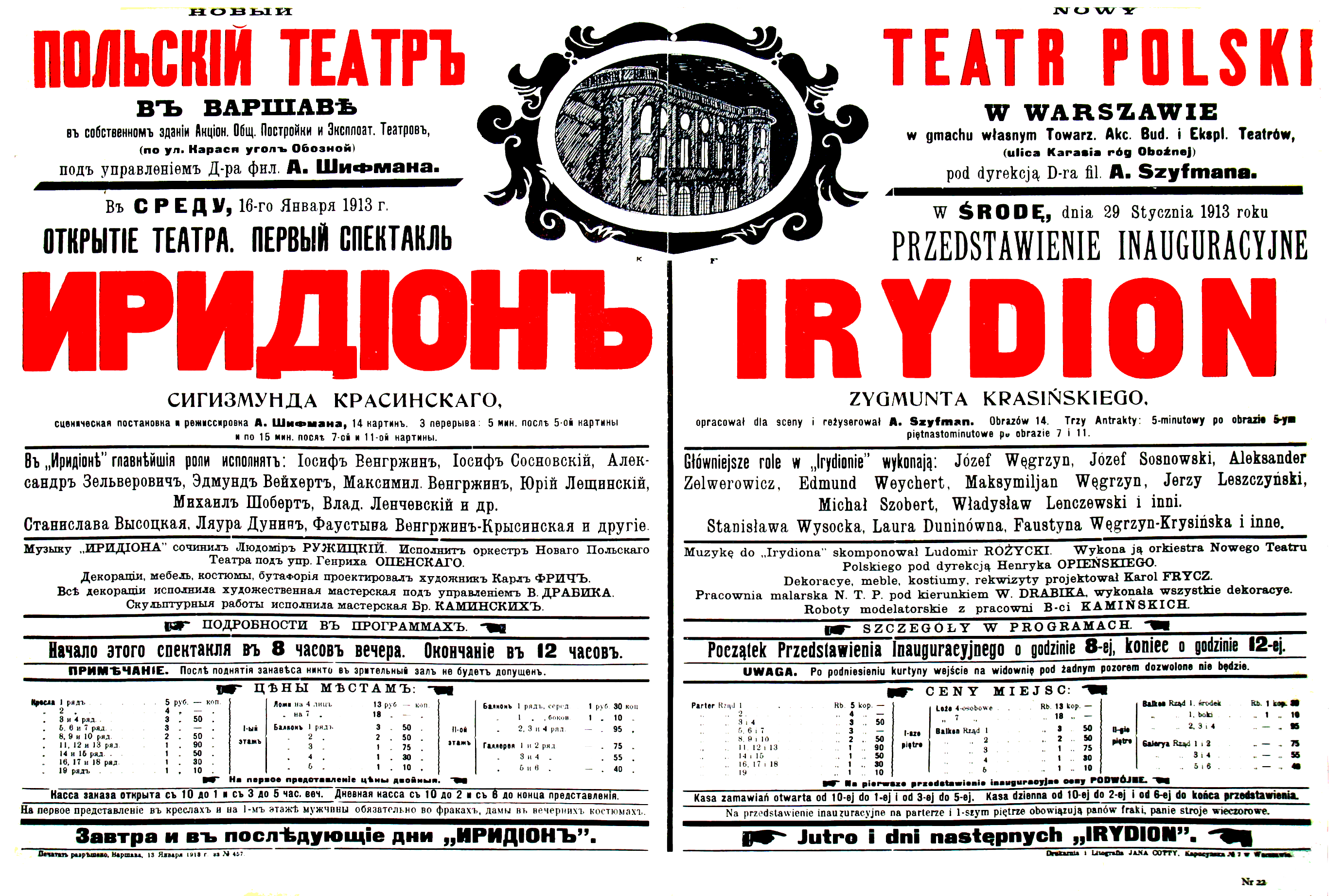
Playbill announcing (in Russian and Polish) the 1913 premiere of Irydion by Zygmunt Krasiński at Teatr Polski in Warsaw

Irydion is a drama written by Polish poet Zygmunt Krasiński. He began work on it in 1832 and published it in 1836. It debuted on stage in 1913 at Teatr Polski in Warsaw.

It remains one of Krasiński's best known works.

== Plot ==
The action of the drama takes place in Ancient Rome around 222 CE. during the reign of Elagabalus. The basic motive of the play is the rebellion of Greek Irydion, son of Amfiloch, against the Romans - a transparent allusion to the tragedy of the Polish November Uprising. The story is focused on the dilemma that revolves around a contradiction between the legitimate and noble aim of overthrowing despotism and the more prosaic motivation of Irydion's actions (revenge) and the despicable means (deception, ruthlessness) he uses in order to advance his goal. The hero's tragedy results from taking premature actions, as well as the destructive influence of ancient fate.

== Theme and significance ==
In Irydion, Krasiński again takes up the theme of societal decay. He condemns the excesses of revolutionary movements, arguing that motives such as retribution have no place within the Christian ethic; many contemporaries, however, saw the play as an endorsement of militant struggle for Poland's independence, whereas Krasiński's intent was to advocate for organic work as a means to society's advancement. Krasiński began writing Irydion before his more enduring work, the drama The Undivine Comedy, but published it after the latter. Czesław Miłosz comments that, while Irydion is a work of considerable talent, especially in its insightful analysis of the decadence of Rome, it is not on a par with The Undivine Comedy.
