= Przedmieście Oławskie =

District in Wrocław, Poland

- District of Wrocław
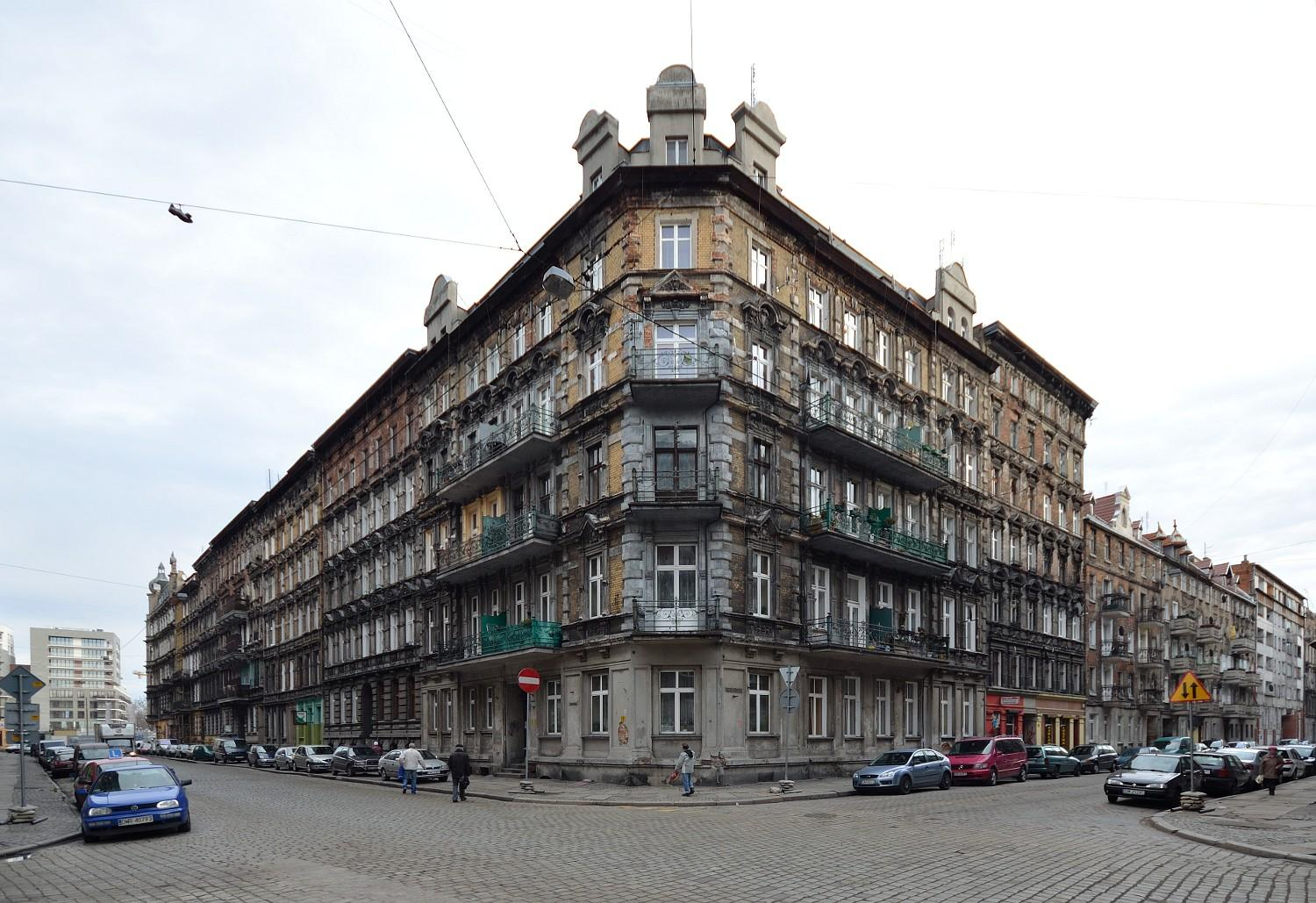
- Typical tenement houses of Przedmieście Oławskie

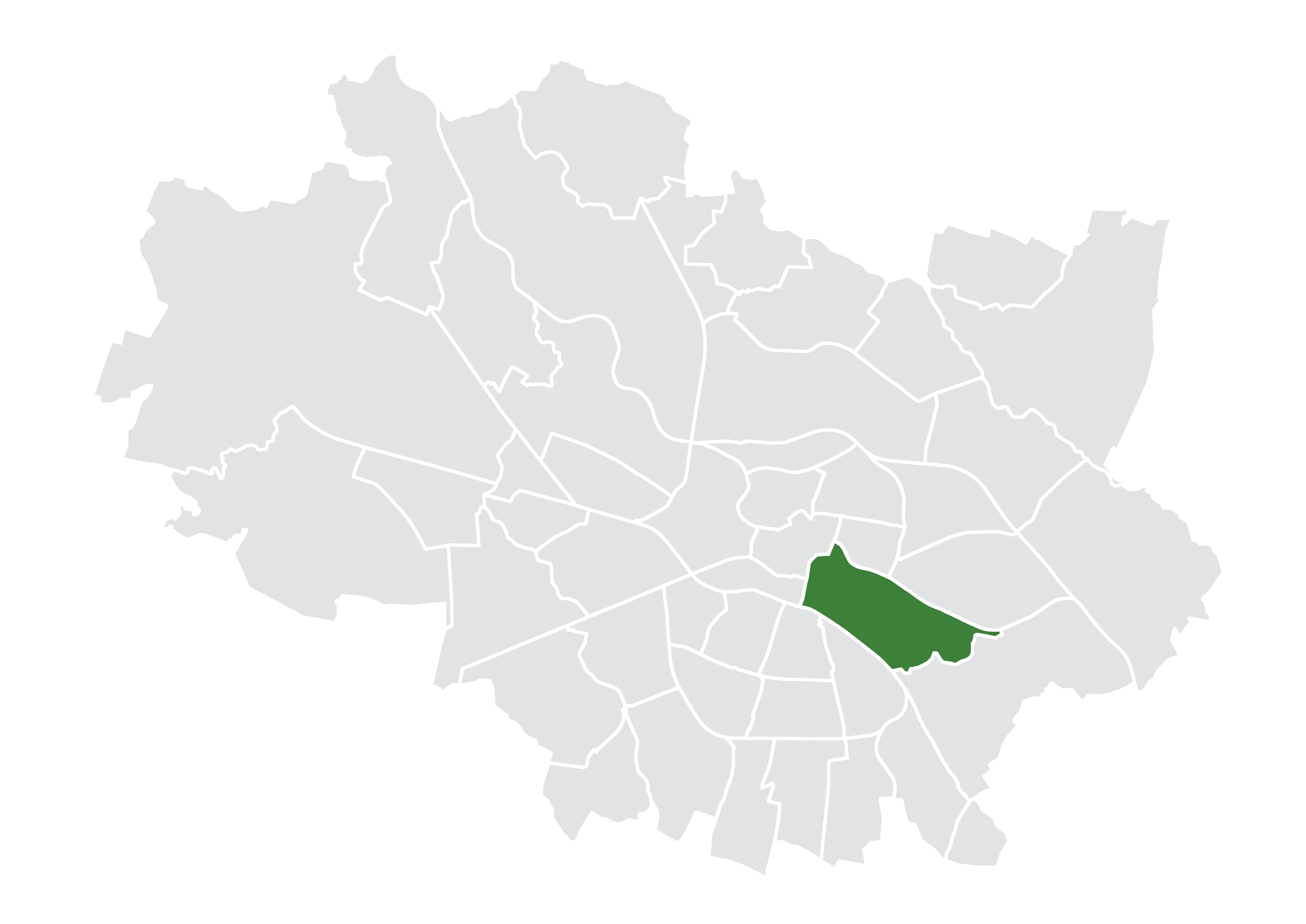
- Location of Przedmieście Oławskie within Wrocław
- Country: Poland
- Voivodeship: Lower Silesian
- County/City: Wrocław
- Incorporated into the city: 1808
- Established the modern-day district: 1991

Population (2022)
  - Total: 20,316
- Time zone: UTC+1 (CET)
  - Summer (DST): UTC+2 (CEST)
- Area code: +48 71
- Website: Osiedle Przedmieście Oławskie

Przedmieście Oławskie (Polish pronunciation: [pʂɛdˈmjɛɕt͡ɕɛ ɔˈwafskjɛ], German: Ohlauer Vorstadt, [ˈoːlaʊɐ ˈfoːɐ̯ʃtat]), lit. 'Oława Suburb', is a district in Wrocław, Poland, located in the central part of the city. It was established in the territory of the former Krzyki district. Part of the district is infamously nicknamed the Bermuda Triangle (Polish: Trójkąt Bermudzki) due to high crime rate.

== History ==
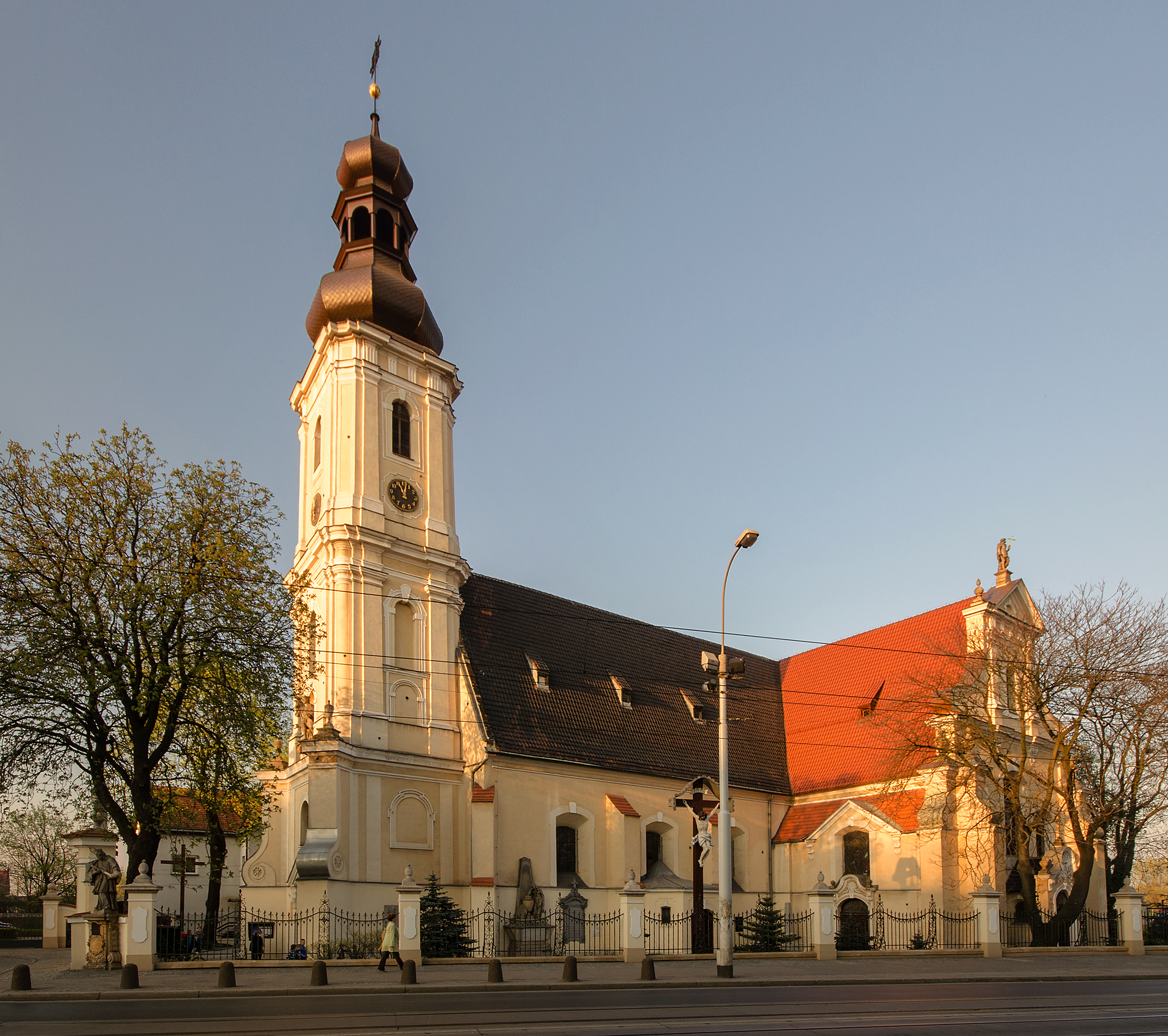
Saint Maurice church, first built in the 12th century, rebuilt in later periods

In the 12th century, the Saint Maurice church was built in the present-day Przedmieście Oławskie district. The church is associated with first Walloon immigrants to Poland, who came to the area in the 12th century (see: Walloons in Poland), however, later it was an important church of the local Polish population. In the 13th century, today's Przedmieście Oławskie was one of the places where monks of the Order of Saint Lazarus settled in Poland, and soon the Saint Lazarus church was built and a leprosarium was founded. In the following centuries, the hospital expanded its services and also treated other diseases.

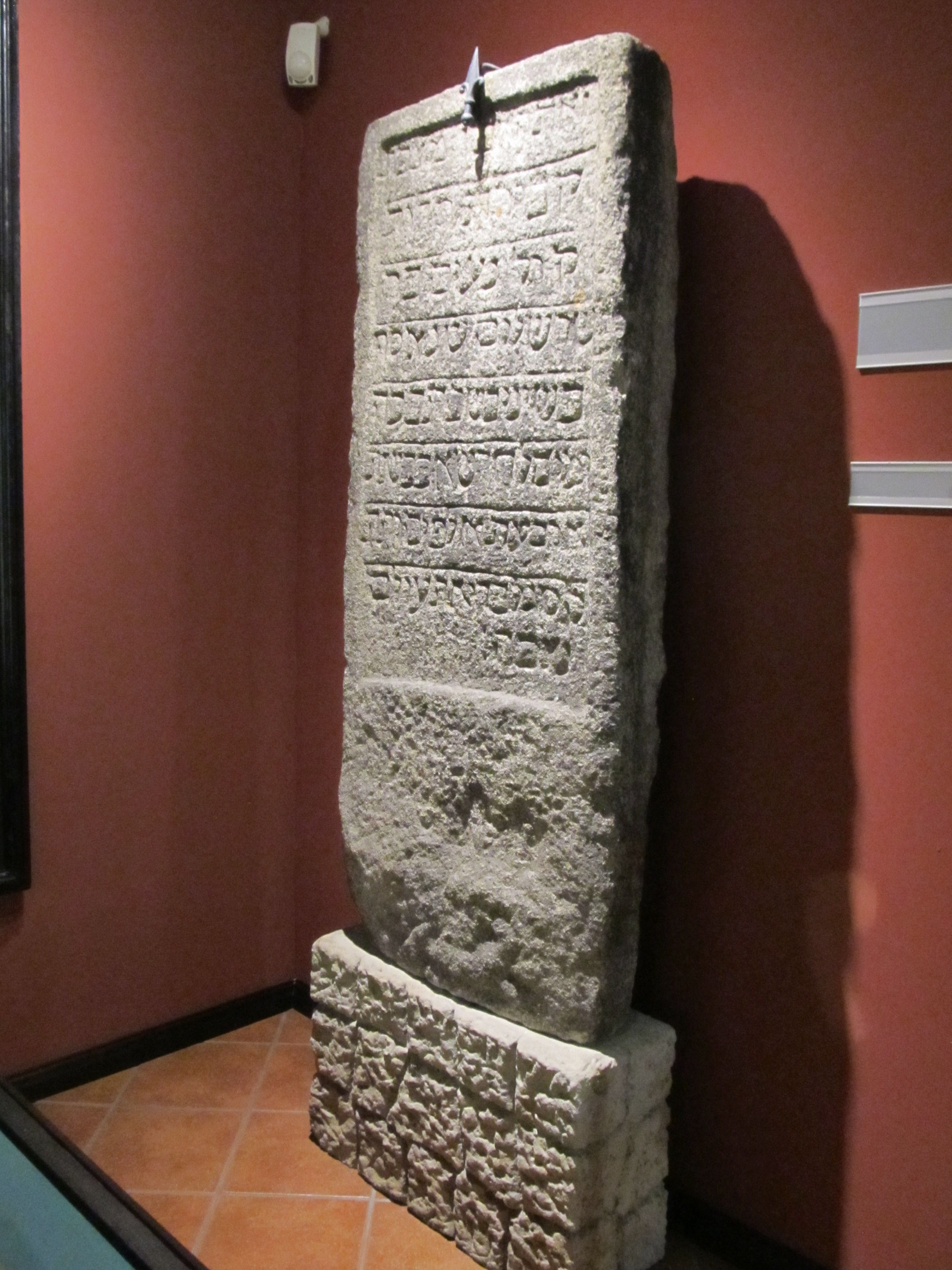
The gravestone of David ben Sar Shalom, now on display

The district was home to a Jewish cemetery prior to 1345, when it was removed by John of Luxembourg. Today, the gravestone of David ben Sar Shalon (d. 1203) is likely the oldest existing Jewish gravestone in Poland and is on display at the City Museum of Wrocław in the Royal Palace.

Until the early 19th century, the area was a suburban village with fields, wooden buildings, gardens, mills, and workshops of small craftsmen. In 1808, the walls around the center collapsed as a consequence of the Napoleonic army's capture of the city, and the area officially became part of Breslau.

The area continued to develop in the following decades, thanks to the construction of the Upper Silesian railroad line. Small factories and warehouses were built to store and transport goods by rail.

During the siege of Breslau, 40% of the housing development was destroyed. The area is characterized by pre-war tenement buildings. The second half of the 20th century marked the beginning of a bad reputation for this part of the city, formerly known as the Bermuda Triangle due to its high crime rate.

In 1991, after reforms in the administrative division of Wrocław, Przedmieście Oławskie became one of the city's 48 districts.

== Landmarks ==
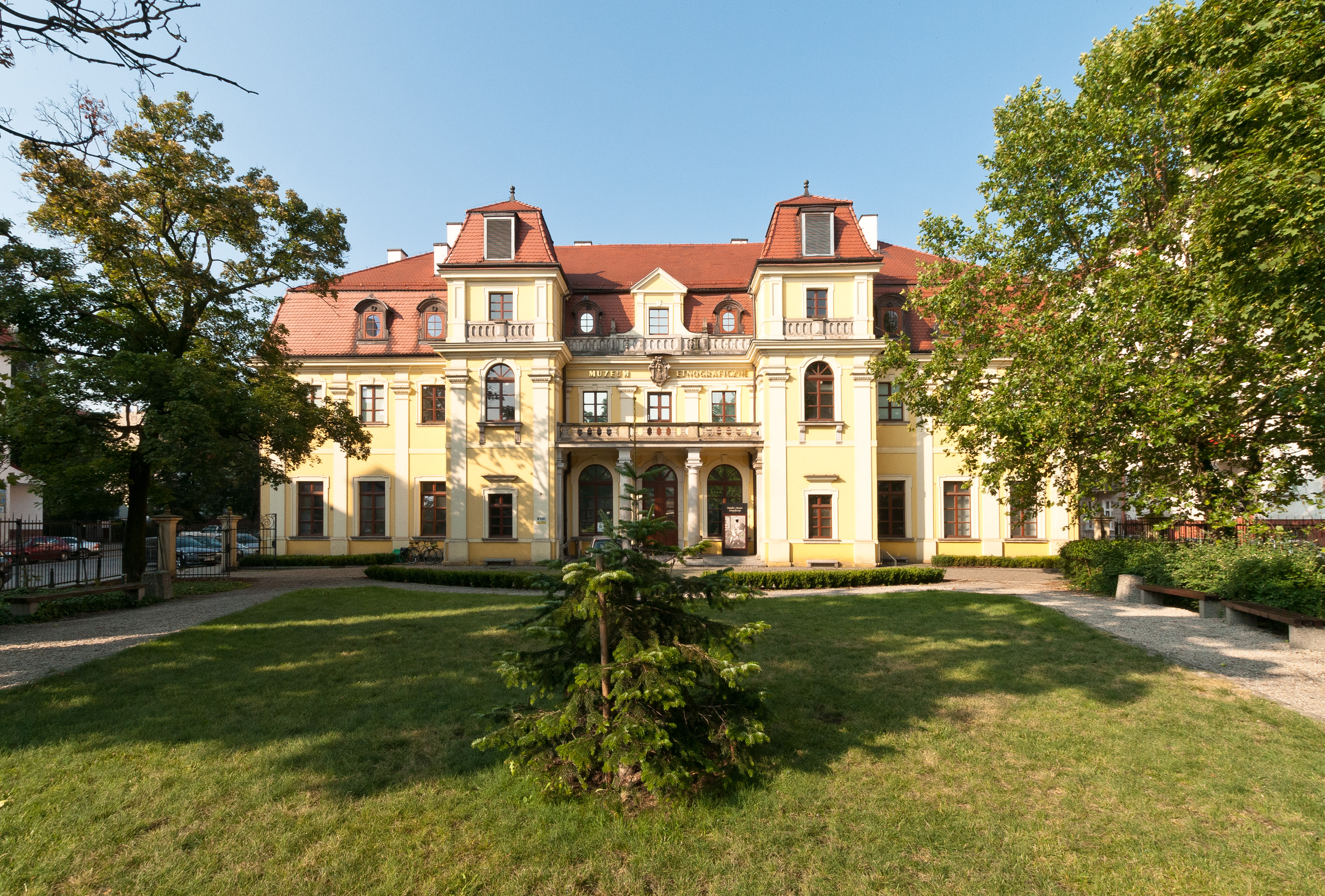
The Ethnographic Museum

- Ethnographic Museum, a branch of the National Museum, Wrocław
- Saint Maurice church, first built in the 12th century, rebuilt in Gothic and Baroque styles in later periods, where the thumb of Polish Romantic poet and playwright Aleksander Fredro is embedded in one of its walls
- Saint Lazarus church, possibly first built in the 13th century during the rule of Henry I the Bearded, then rebuilt in its current Gothic style in the 14th century, church of the Order of Saint Lazarus until 1810. The church played an important role in the city's history twice, as it served as a fortified command post of Hungarian King Matthias Corvinus against a Polish-Czech siege in 1474, and as a place from which the Prussians shelled the city in 1757.
- Zygmunt Krasiński Square, a public garden square, covering an area of 12,725 m^{2} (136,970 sq ft). Established in 1888 on the site of former cemeteries. Designed by H. Richter in 1892, it has undergone several modernisations, with a major restoration in 2000.
