= Władysław Krasiński =

Polish nobleman (1844–1873)

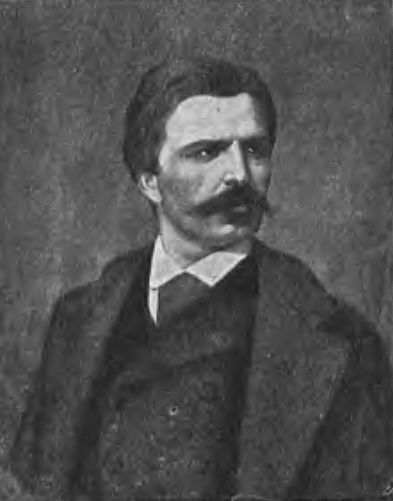
- Coat of arms: Ślepowron
- Born: 27 September 1844; Warsaw
- Died: 6 February 1873 (aged 28)
- Noble family: Krasiński
- Consort: Róża Potocka
- Father: Zygmunt Krasiński
- Mother: Eliza Branicka

Count Władysław Krasiński (1844–1873) was a Polish nobleman, landowner, lawyer and historian.

== Biography ==
Władysław was the 3rd Ordynat of the Opinogóra estates. He was the son of one of Poland's greatest romantic poets Zygmunt Krasiński.

During the January Uprising he worked in Paris together with Prince Władysław Czartoryski. He was passionate in the humanities and organized the ordination collections. He founded the Library of ord. Krasińscy, initiated the publishing house Library of ord. In 1868. Krasińscy published together with Władysław Chomętowski the first five volumes.

He was married to Countess Róża Potocka and had three children, Adam Krasiński, Elżbieta Maria Krasińska and Zofia Krasińska.
