= Roman decadence =

Ancient Roman culture

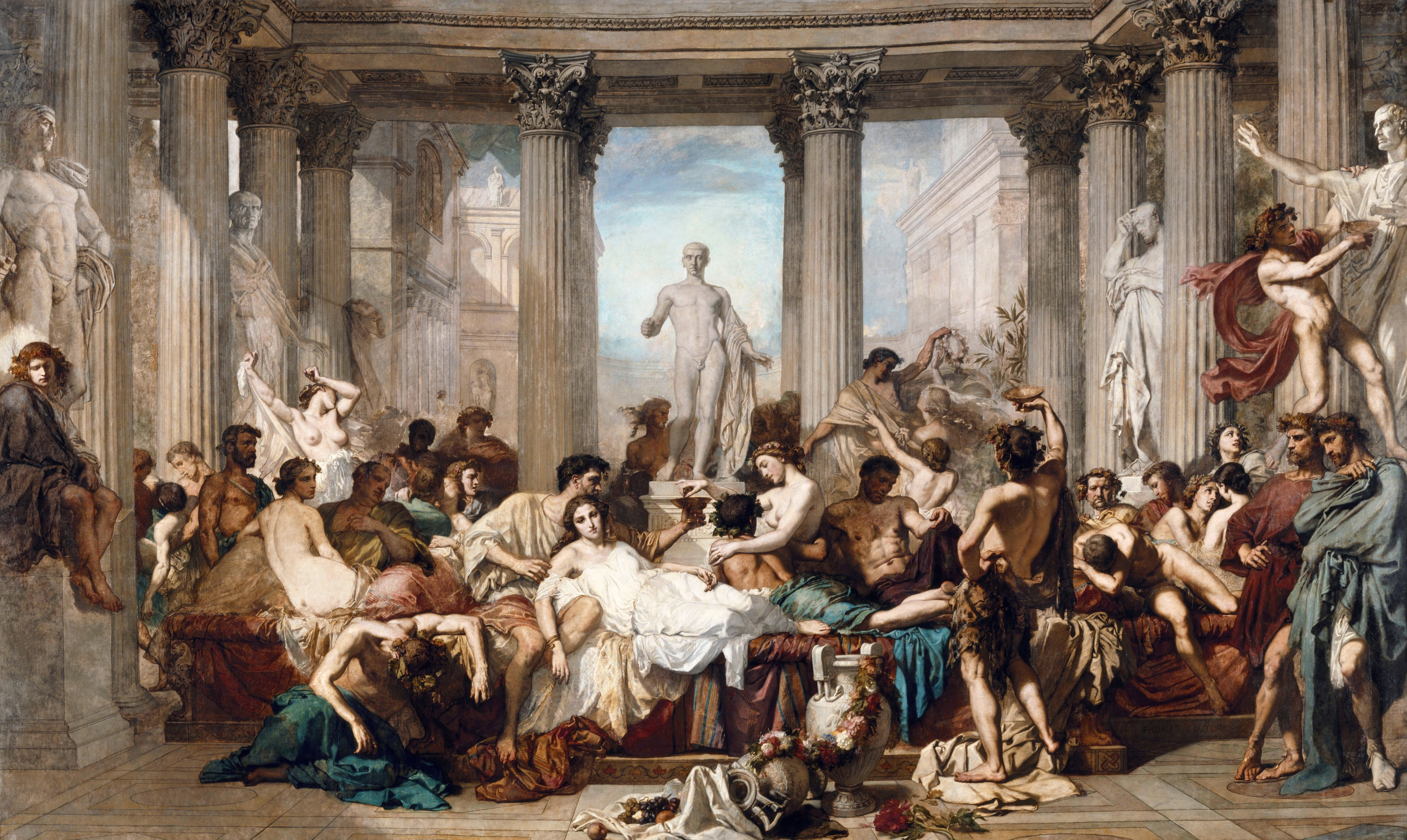
The Romans in their Decadence, French painting by Thomas Couture, 1847

Roman decadence refers to the popular criticism of the culture of the later Roman Empire's elites, seen also in much of its earlier historiography and 19th and early 20th century art depicting Roman life. This criticism describes the later Roman Empire as reveling in luxury, in its extreme characterized by corrupting "extravagance, weakness, and sexual deviance", as well as "orgies and sensual excesses".

== Background ==
Decadence, literally meaning "decline", is the term most commonly used to describe the social decline among the ruling elite of the Roman Empire and is associated with hedonism, irreligion, and immorality.

== In art ==
These characterizations of Rome achieved the height of their prominence in the art and popular culture of the Nineteenth century among European countries such as Britain or Russia.

== See also ==
- Epicureanism
- Historiography of the fall of the Western Roman Empire
- Messalina
