= Portrait of Countess Yekaterina von Engelhardt =

Painting by Élisabeth Vigée Le Brun (1796) at Louvre museum

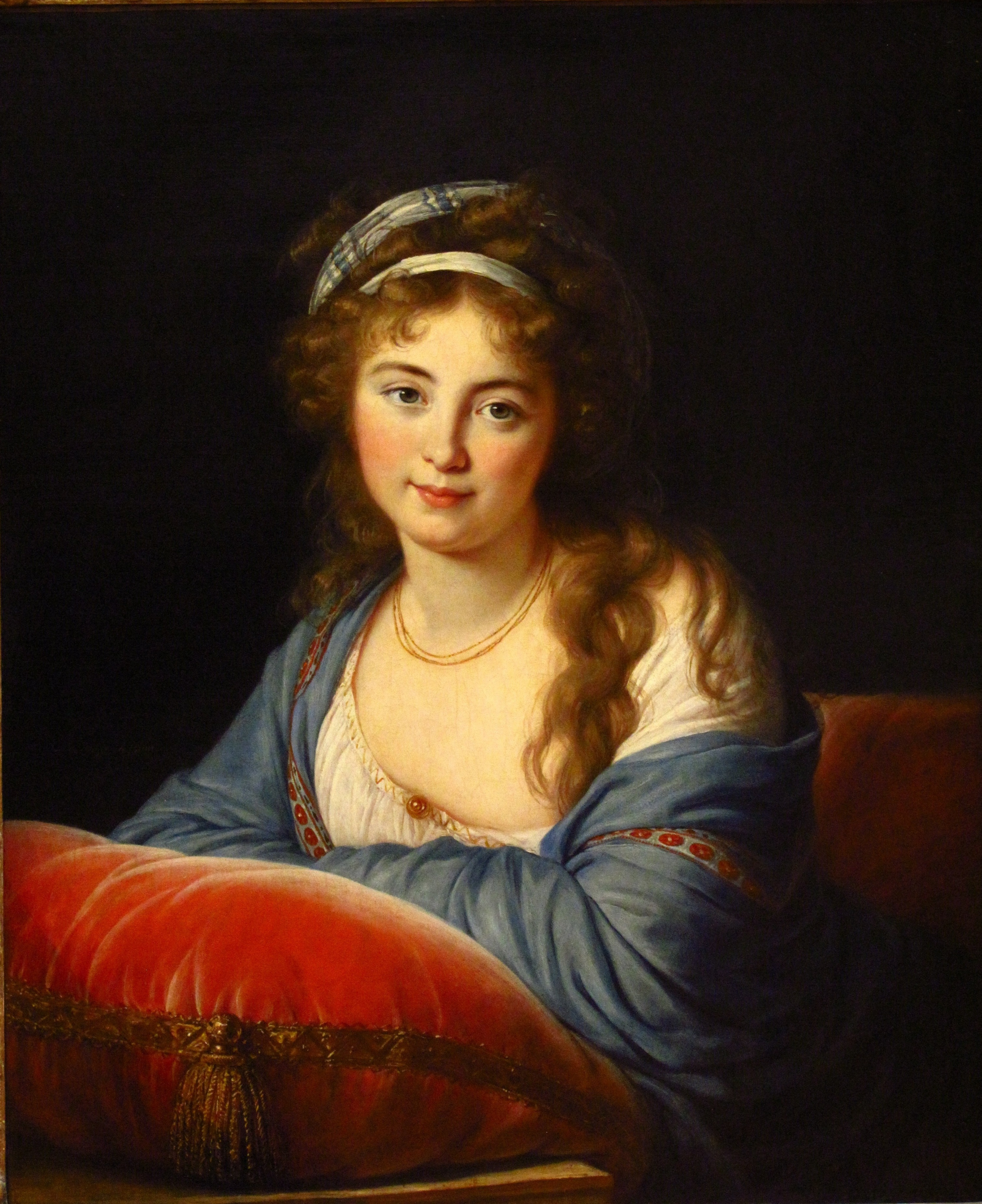
- Artist: Élisabeth Vigée Le Brun
- Year: 1796
- Medium: Oil on canvas
- Dimensions: 80 cm × 66 cm (31 in × 26 in)
- Location: Louvre, Paris

Portrait of Countess Yekaterina von Engelhardt is an oil-on-canvas painting created in 1796 by the French painter Élisabeth Vigée Le Brun. Its subject, Yekaterina von Engelhardt, was a Russian noblewoman and lady in waiting. The portrait was produced in Saint Petersburg and now is held in the Louvre, in Paris, which acquired it in 1966. It was exhibited in Saint Petersburg in 1905 as part of the exhibition Russian Portraits of the 18th and 19th Centuries.

== Other versions ==
An earlier portrait of the same subject was produced by the artist in Naples in 1790 and is now in the Musée Jacquemart-André in Paris.

== Description and analysis ==
The portrait represents Skavronskaia smiling, dressed in a white and blue dress, while leaning on a red velvet cushion. She is depicted on a black background which contrasts with the warm light which seems to radiate from her look and her chest and is reflected on the cushion. She has a sweet and gentle expression and looks directly at the viewer.

For Marie-Jo Bonnet, this painting it is an ode to feminine beauty, softness and tranquillity; she also underlines that the painting of Vigée Le Brun was not seen by her contemporaries as typically feminine, but as a personification of grace as understood in her time.
