= Yekaterina von Engelhardt =

Russian lady-in-waiting and noblewoman (1761–1829)

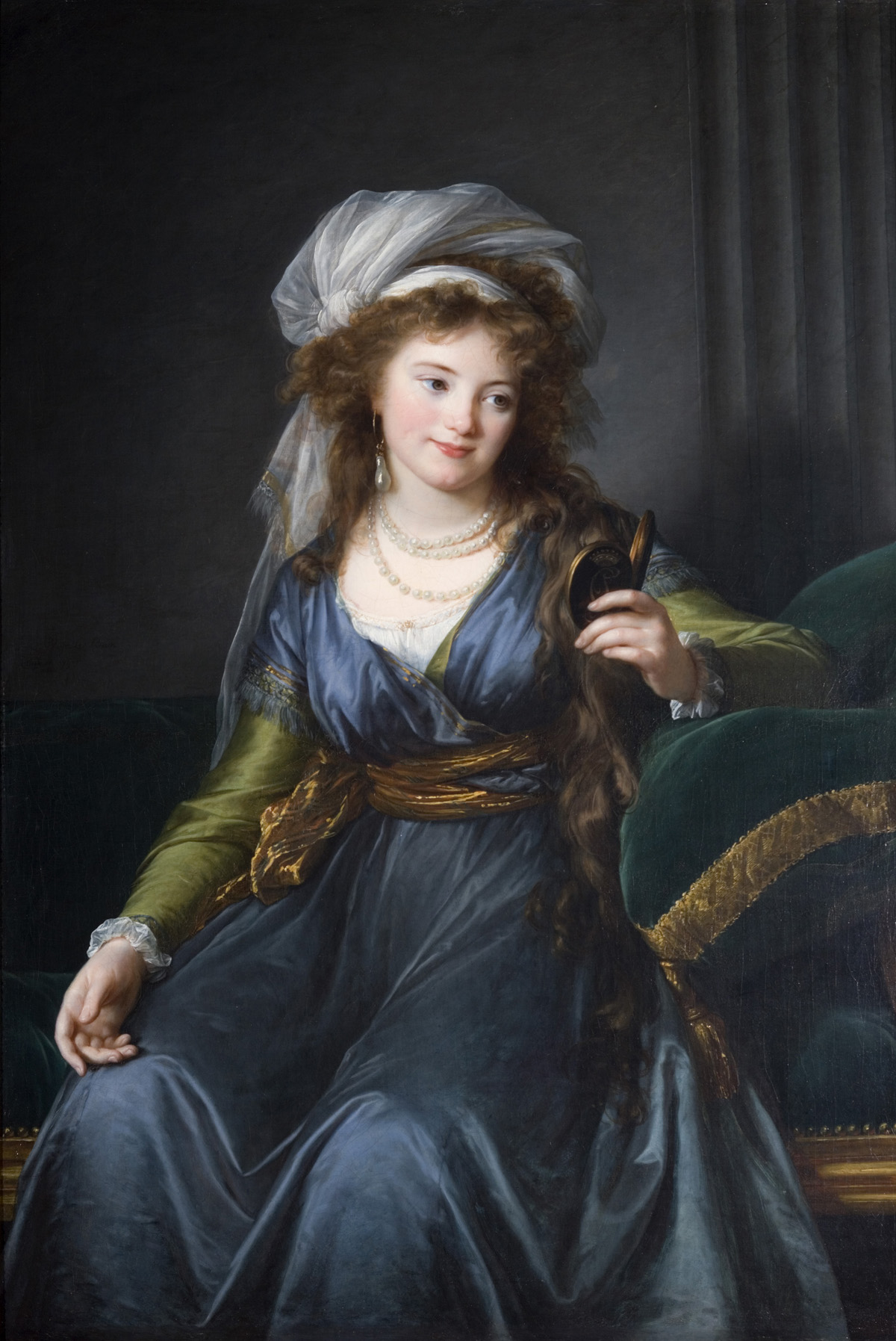
- Portrait by Elisabeth Vigée-Lebrun, 1790. The same artist also painted her in 1796.
- Born: Yekaterina Vasilievna Engelhardt; 1761
- Died: 1829 (aged 67–68); Saint Petersburg, Russia
- Noble family: Engelhardt
- Spouses: Count Pavel Martinovich Skavronsky; Count Giulio Renato Litta
- Issue: Catherine Bagration; Maria Skavronskya
- Father: Vasili von Engelhardt
- Mother: Elena Alexandrovna Potemkina
- Occupation: Lady-in-waiting to Catherine the Great

Catherine Engelhardt (Catherine Vassilievna Engelhardt; Russian: Екатерина Васильевна Энгельгардт; 1761–1829) was a Russian lady-in-waiting and noblewoman. She was the niece and lover of Grigory Potyomkin, and the favored lady-in-waiting of Catherine the Great. Alongside her sisters, she was given a favored position at the Russian imperial court during the reign of Catherine, where they were described as "almost Grand Duchesses", the jewels of the court and honorary members of the imperial family.

== Early life ==
She was the daughter of Wassily von Engelhardt (1720–1794), member of the Baltic German nobility and his spouse Yelena Alexandrovna Marfa Potemkin (d. 1775), niece of Grigory Potyomkin.

== Biography ==
She was introduced to the Russian court with her five sisters (and her brother) in 1775. They were initially uneducated and ignorant, but were soon given a sophisticated polish and made to be the most favoured women at the Russian court; they were treated almost as if they were a part of the imperial family, and were to be known as: "almost Grand Duchesses" and as the "jewels" and ornaments of the Russian court. Potemkin gave them large dowries and had Catherine appoint them ladies-in-waiting. They were alleged to be the lovers of their uncle, which was one of the most known gossip subjects and scandals of the age.

She became a lady-in-waiting in 1777, and, for a time, Empress Catherine's illegitimate son Bobrinskij was in love with her. Her relationship with Bobrinskij took place after his affair with her sister Aleksandra ended in 1779, and was to continue on and off sporadically for the rest of his life. In 1780, she spent some time in the countryside with her sister Varvara, and it is possible that she gave birth to her uncle's child.

In 1781, Potemkin arranged for her to marry Count Pavel Martinovich Skavronsky, who died in 1793. The count was known to be madly in love with her, commissioning the costly French artist Vigée Le Brun to paint her in 1790, and again in 1796.

The Countess was as sweet and pretty as an angel. The famous Potemkin, her uncle, had showered her with riches, of which she made no use. Her pleasure was stretching out on a couch without a corset, wrapped in a black pelisse. Her mother-in-law had her sent from Paris cases of the most delightful creations of Mlle Bertin, [Queen Marie Antoinette's dress maker]. I do not believe the Countess ever opened a single one of them, and when her mother-in-law expressed the wish to see her wearing some of those charming gowns and hats... , she responded nonchalantly: Should I bother? for whom? for what purpose? She told me the same thing when she showed me her jewelry box, one of the most splendid imaginable. It contained enormous diamonds that Potemkin had given her and that I never saw her wear. I remember her telling me that in order to fall asleep, she had a slave under her bed who would tell her the same story every night. In the daytime, she was constantly idle. She had no education, and her conversation was nonexistent. Nevertheless, thanks to her ravishing face and angelic temperament, she possessed an invincible charm. Count Scavronski was madly in love with her ...

— Louise-Élisabeth Vigée-Lebrun

In 1798, she was married for love to Count Giulio Renato Litta (1763–1839). She was described as sweet, kind, passive and indolent".

== Sources ==
- Baillio, Joseph; Baetjer, Katharine; Lang, Paul (2016-02-15). Vigée Le Brun. Metropolitan Museum of Art. ISBN 978-1-58839-581-8.
- Goodden, Angelica (2011-05-31). Miss Angel: The Art and World of Angelica Kauffman, Eighteenth-Century Icon. Random House. ISBN 978-1-4464-4835-9.
- Kimbell Art Museum Exhibition Catalog. "Countess Skavronsky, 1790". Bat Guano Web Works. Fort Worth, Texas. Archived from the original on November 17, 2025.
- Montefiore, Simon Sebag (2005). Potemkin och Katarina den stora – en kejserlig förbindelse [Potemkin and Catherine the Great – an Imperial commitment] (in Swedish). Prisma. ISBN 978-91-518-4497-8.
- Montefiore, Simon Sebag (2021-08-04). Catherine the Great & Potemkin: The Imperial Love Affair. Knopf Doubleday Publishing Group. ISBN 978-0-593-46791-6.
- Vigée Le Brun, Élisabeth (1835). Souvenirs de Mme Louise-Élisabeth Vigée-Lebrun (in French). Vol. II. Paris: Henri Fournier.
