= Alexandra Branitskaya =

Russian courtier (1754–1838)

Countess Alexandra Branitskaya
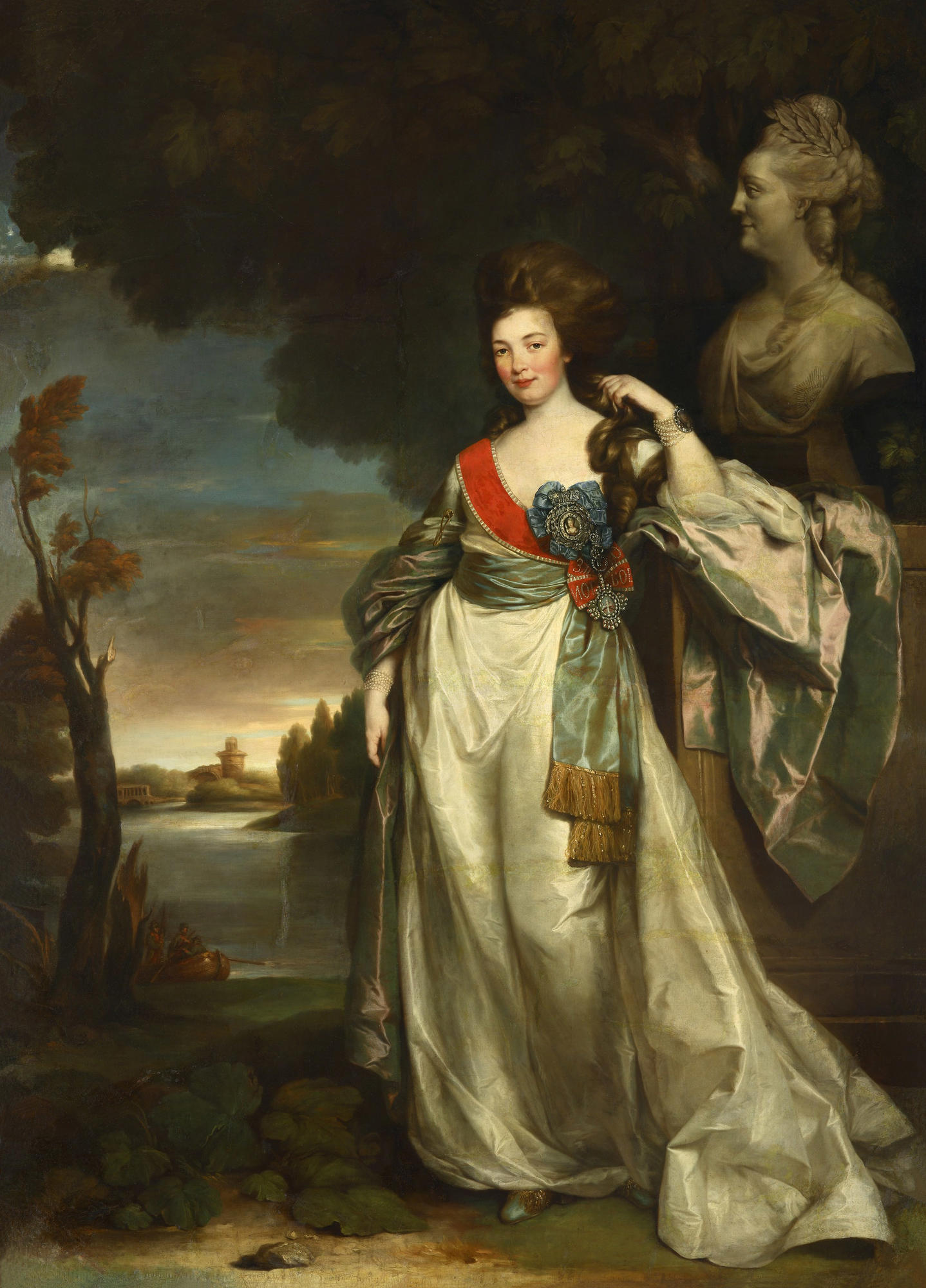
- Born: Alexandra Vasilievna von Engelhardt; 1754; Saint Petersburg, Russian Empire
- Died: 15 September 1838 (aged 83–84)
- Noble family: Engelhardt
- Spouse: Franciszek Ksawery Branicki
- Issue: Katarzyna Branicka; Aleksander Branicki; Władysław Grzegorz Branicki; Zofia Branicka; Elżbieta Branicka
- Father: Vasily von Engelhardt (officially)
- Mother: Yelena Marfa Potemkin (officially); Catherine the Great (rumoured)
- Occupation: Lady-in-waiting

Countess Alexandra Branitskaya (née von Engelhardt, Russian: Александра Васильевна Браницкая, Polish: Aleksandra Branicka [Braɲit͡ska]; 1754 – 15 September 1838), also known as Sanecka and Countess Branicka, was a leading Russian courtier. She was the niece and confidante of Grigory Potemkin, and Catherine the Great's lady-in-waiting. She was one of the most notable socialites at the Russian Imperial court during Catherine's reign, and was conspicuously treated as a virtual member of the Imperial family. Through her marriage to Branicki she became administrator of the immense estate of Biała Cerkiew (today Bila Tserkva, Kyiv Oblast, Ukraine).

== Biography ==
Officially, she was the daughter of a Vasily von Engelhardt, member of the Baltic German nobility, and his wife Yelena Marfa, née Potemkin, a sister of Grigory Potemkin, and thus the latter's niece. However, at least one historian has taken a close interest in the gossip swirling around the imperial court at the time of her birth.

One theory was that she was the first-born illegitimate child of Catherine with Grigory Potemkin. According to an alternative account, she was Catherine's daughter by Count Sergey Saltykov and that on learning of her arrival, tsarina Elizabeth had her swiftly substituted for a handy male neonate of Estonian parentage, who eventually grew up to be Tsar Paul, Catherine's son and heir.

Other historians are more dismissive of the gossip. Even as Alexandra was rumoured to be Catherine's own daughter, they nevertheless repeat that it was merely a claim that Alexandra was the first-born who had been switched with the son of an Estonian woman on account of her sex, since a male heir was preferred.

=== Lady-in-waiting ===
Alexandra was introduced to the Russian court with her five sisters and her brother in 1775. They arrived as uneducated and ignorant, but Alexandra was soon given a sophisticated polish and made to be the most favoured woman at the Russian court. They were appointed maids of honour, and Alexandra was in 1777 promoted to the honorary rank of chief maid of honour.

She, in particular, along with her sisters, were treated almost as a part of the Imperial family. They were regarded almost as "Grand Duchesses" and "jewels" of the Russian court. Potemkin gave them large dowries and had Catherine appoint them ladies-in-waiting. They were alleged to be the courtesans of their "uncle", which was one of the most riveting and scandalous subjects of gossip. His first mistress was Varvara. However, after Varvara's marriage in 1779, her sister Alexandra was selected to be her successor.

The British ambassador, Harris wrote about her in terms of, "a young, very attractive and well-shaped lady, with a superior talent for creating plots", who spent a great deal of time with Catherine and Potemkin and that: "unless her uncle changed his attitude toward her, she is likely to become the next female confidante" of Catherine.

She was described as an influential force at the Russian court. She exposed the adultery between the favourite of Catherine, Ivan Rimsky-Korsakov, and Catherine's confidante and lady-in-waiting, Praskovja Bruce, thereby bringing about the fall of both Korsakov and Bruce (1779). She was treated as an "unofficial member of the Imperial family", a position which she took for granted until her death. Ambassador Harris reported that she received gifts and presents in exchange for information, and recommended her as a first-rate informer. She functioned as an agent for the British, from whom she received financial remuneration.

=== Marriage and business enterprise ===
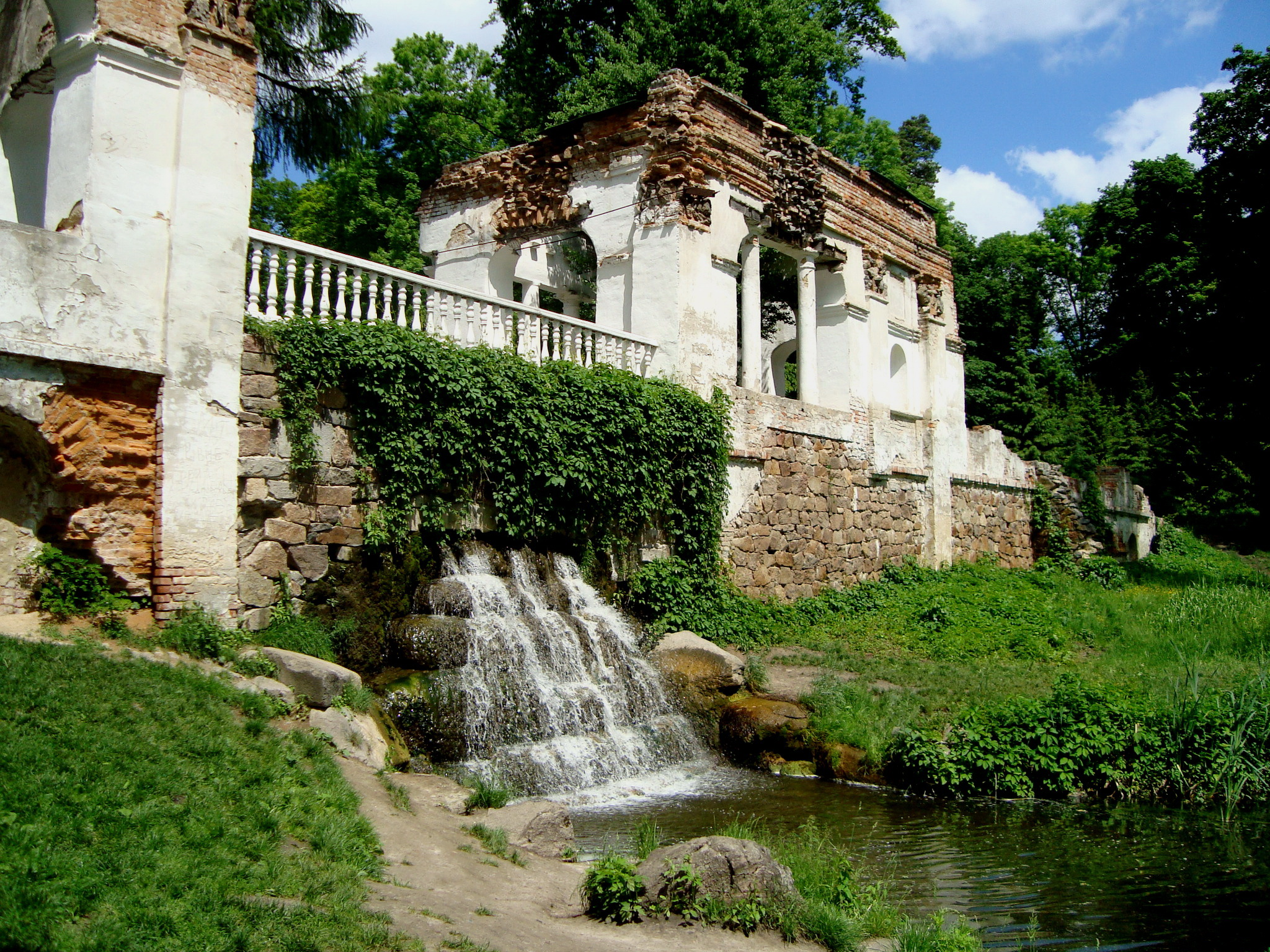
Alexandria Palace

In 1781 she married Count Franciszek Ksawery Branicki (1731–1819), member of the noble Polish House of Branicki. The marriage had been strategically arranged to create a Russian bridgehead into Poland. After her marriage, she could no longer keep her position as maid of honour, which was reserved for unmarried women, but was promoted to the rank of lady-in-waiting, and thus was able to continue to attend court.

Her marriage was described as harmonious. While her spouse lacked any sense of financial restraint and frequently amassed huge and ruinous debts, these were never a problem, since Alexandra was by contrast a shrewd businesswoman. She made millions by trading in wheat and timber from her estates, and so was able to meet her husband's endless debts. She had five children, including, Władysław Grzegorz Branicki and Zofia Branicka.

The enormous estate of Alexandria Palace and park, outside Bila Tserkva, was designed as the epitome of Polish classicism and named after her by her husband, Franciszek.

=== Relationship with Potemkin ===
She was considered the most intimate confidante and friend of Potemkin after Catherine, and his favourite among his nieces. Their alleged sexual relationship ended in 1779 when she was replaced by her sister, Yekaterina, with whom he went on to have an on-and-off relationship for the rest of his life; but the intimate friendship between Aleksandra and Potemkin continued. She acted as Potemkin's official hostess, and any invitation she received from him was a sign of great favour. They also corresponded. She was with him in Ukraine as part of his household on his trips to the south during the 1780s. She often argued with him, which was taken as a sign of their closeness.

In 1791, she expressed the wish that Potemkin should be the next king of Poland. Likewise, for many years, there were rumours in Poland that Potemkin had plans to make her children heirs to the Polish throne. She nursed Potemkin during his final illness. She is said to have "inherited" the actual marriage certificate of Potemkin and Catherine.

=== Later life ===
She created a memorial for Potemkin on his estate, that was visited by Alexander I, who later appointed her a lady of his court.

She was made chief court mistress to the empress in 1824 and served as such until 1838. As such she was the principal lady-in-waiting with responsibility for all the rest of the ladies-in-waiting of the empress. In 1816, Wiegel reported how she was kissed on the hand and treated with the same deference as an imperial grand duchess, and that both she and the court seemed to take this for granted.

== See also ==
- Arboretum Oleksandriya

== Gallery ==
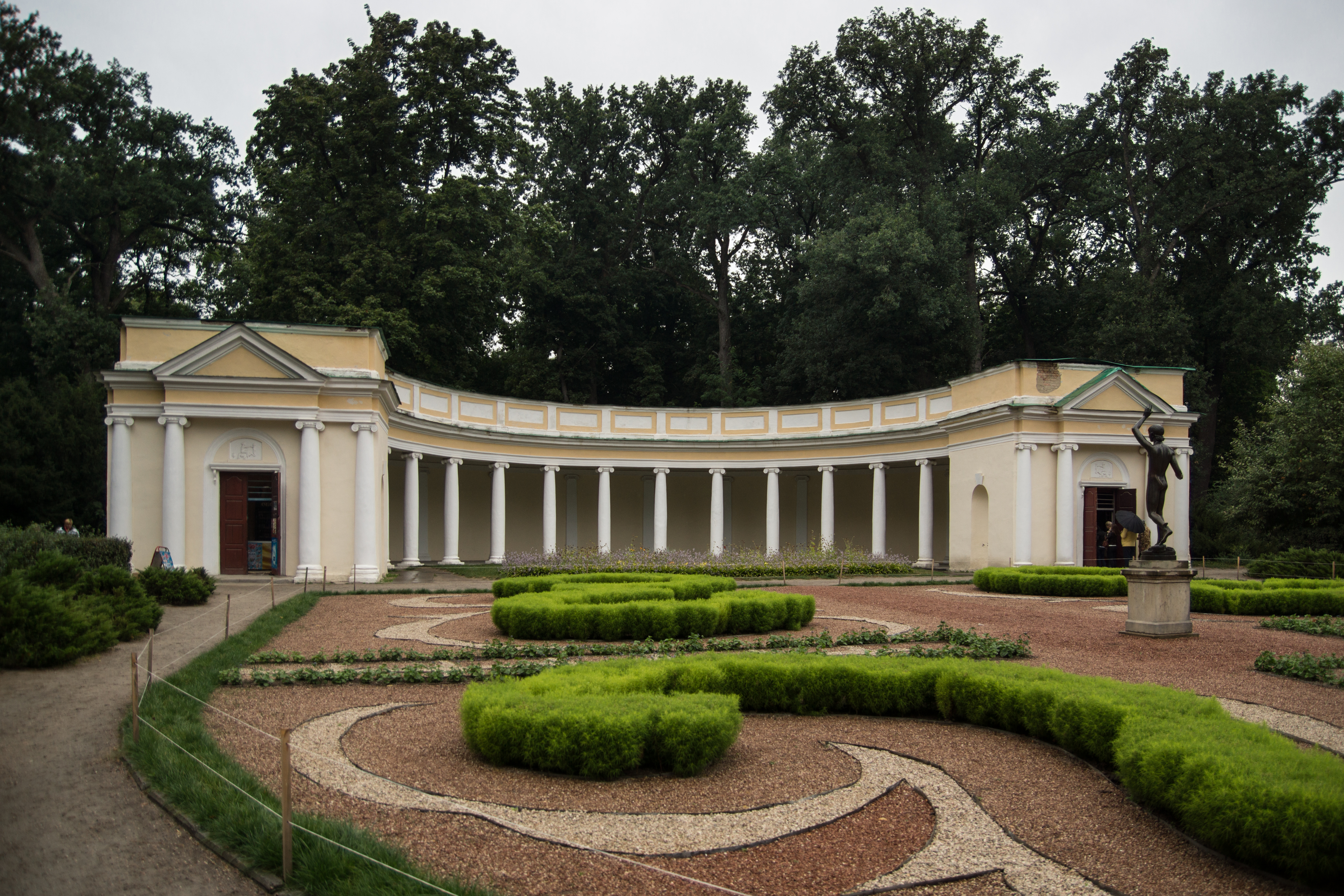
Echo Colonnade

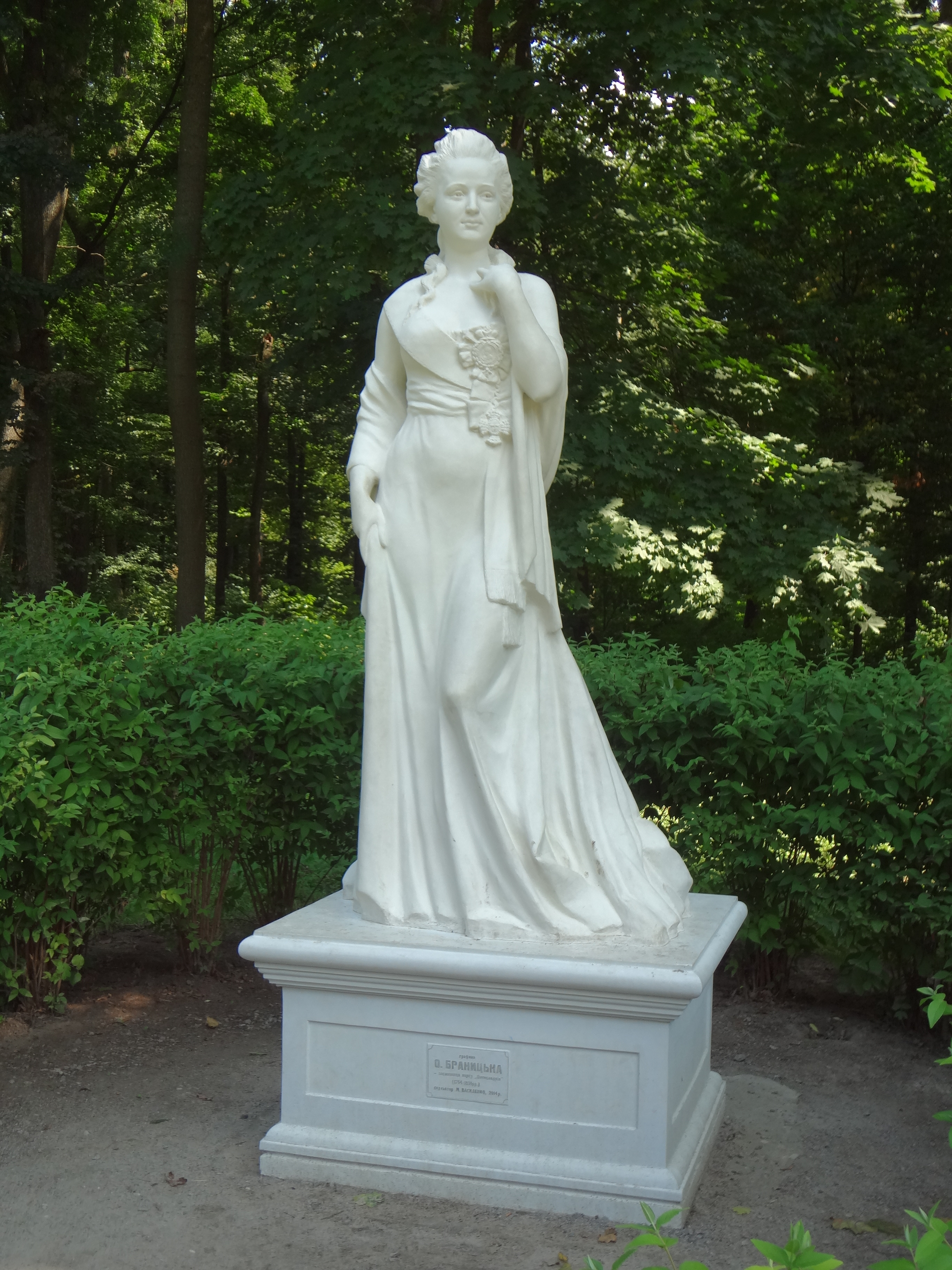
The monument to Alexandra Branitskaya

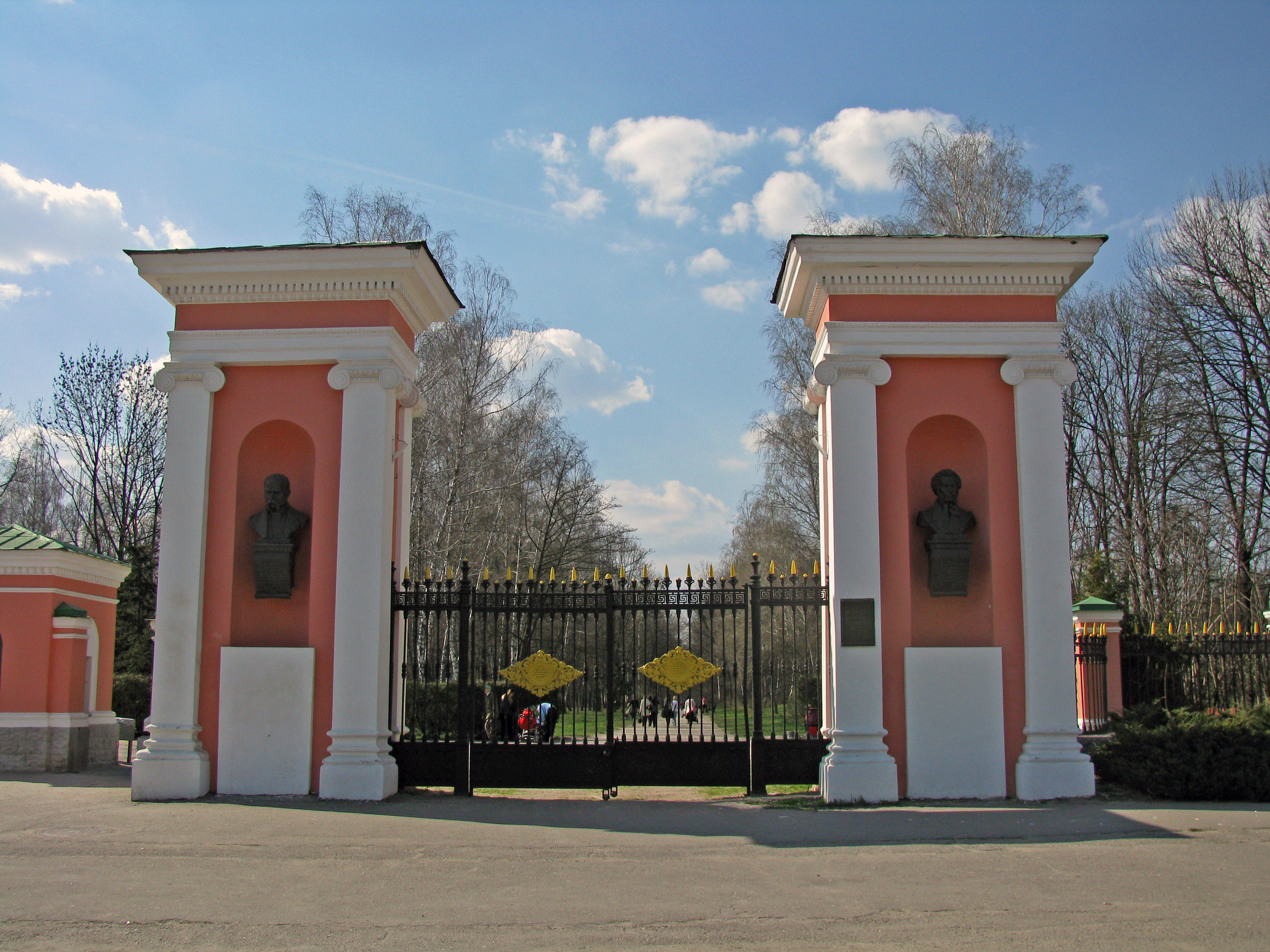
Entrance gate to Alexandria

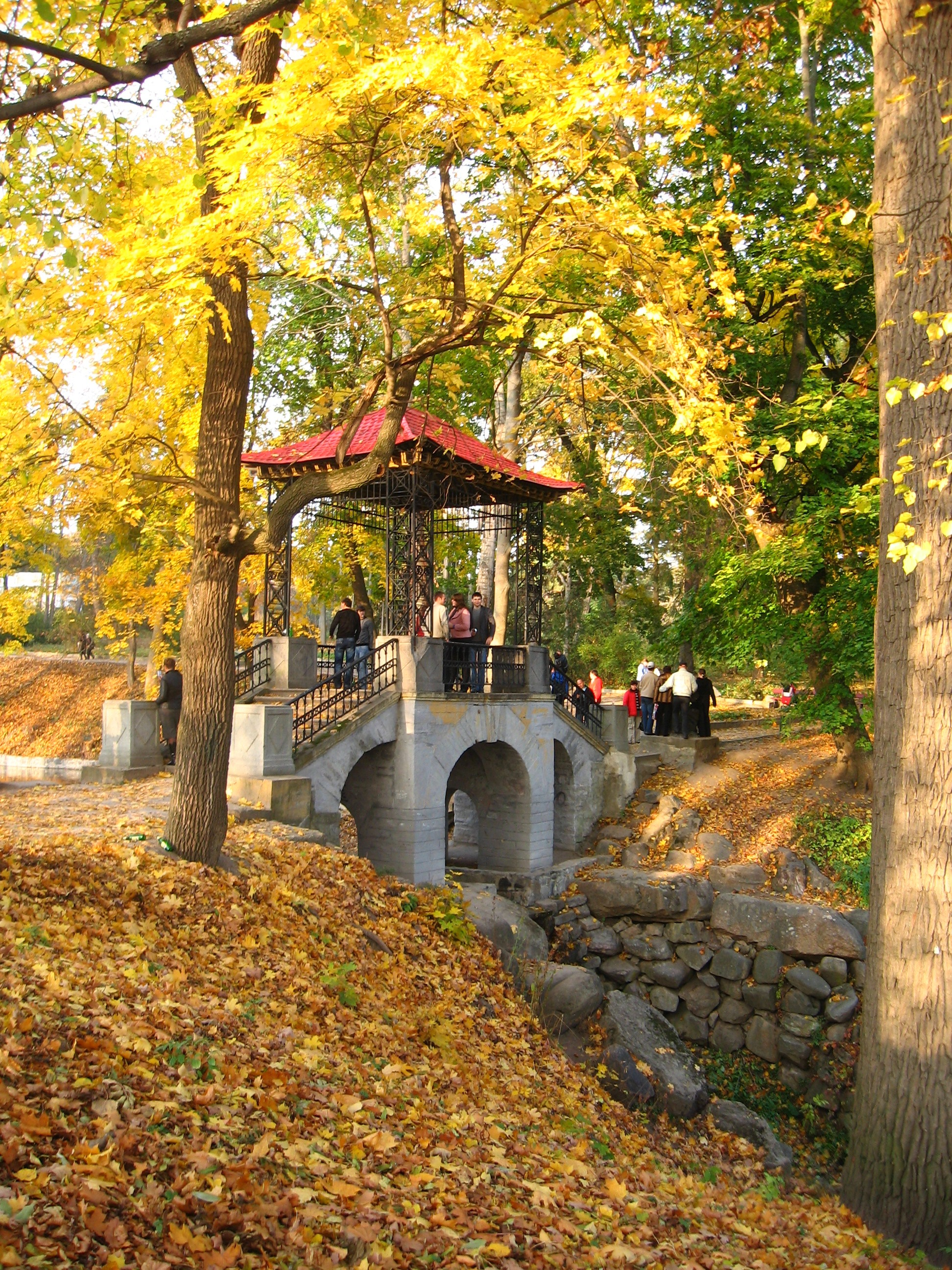
Chinese Bridge

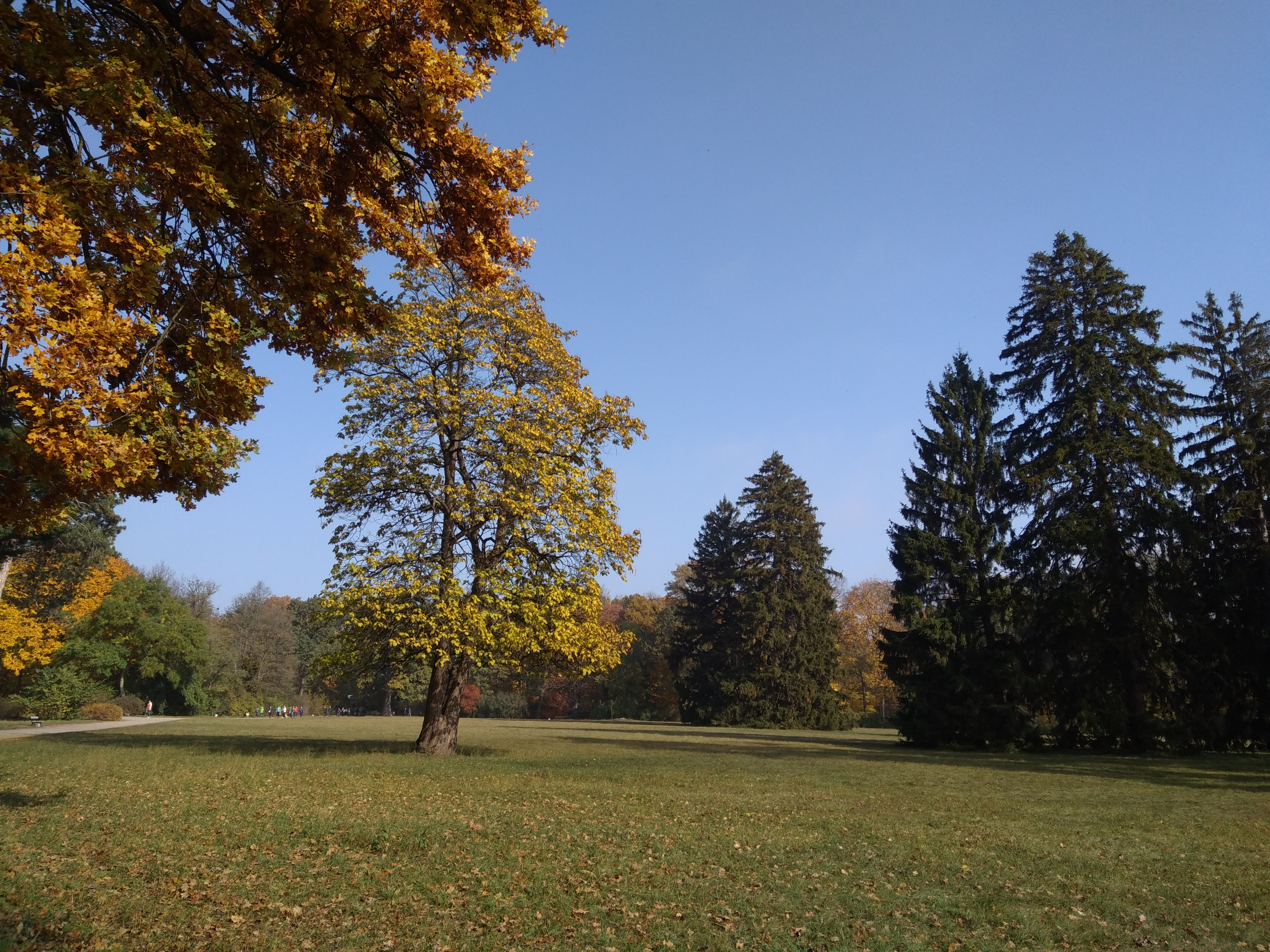
Big Glade

== Bibliography ==
- Marian Kukiel, Książę Adam, Warszawa 1993.
- Henryk Mościcki, "Aleksandra Branicka", w: Polski Słownik Biograficzny, t. II, Kraków 1936
