= Arboretum Oleksandriya =

Arboretum in Bila Tserkva, Ukraine

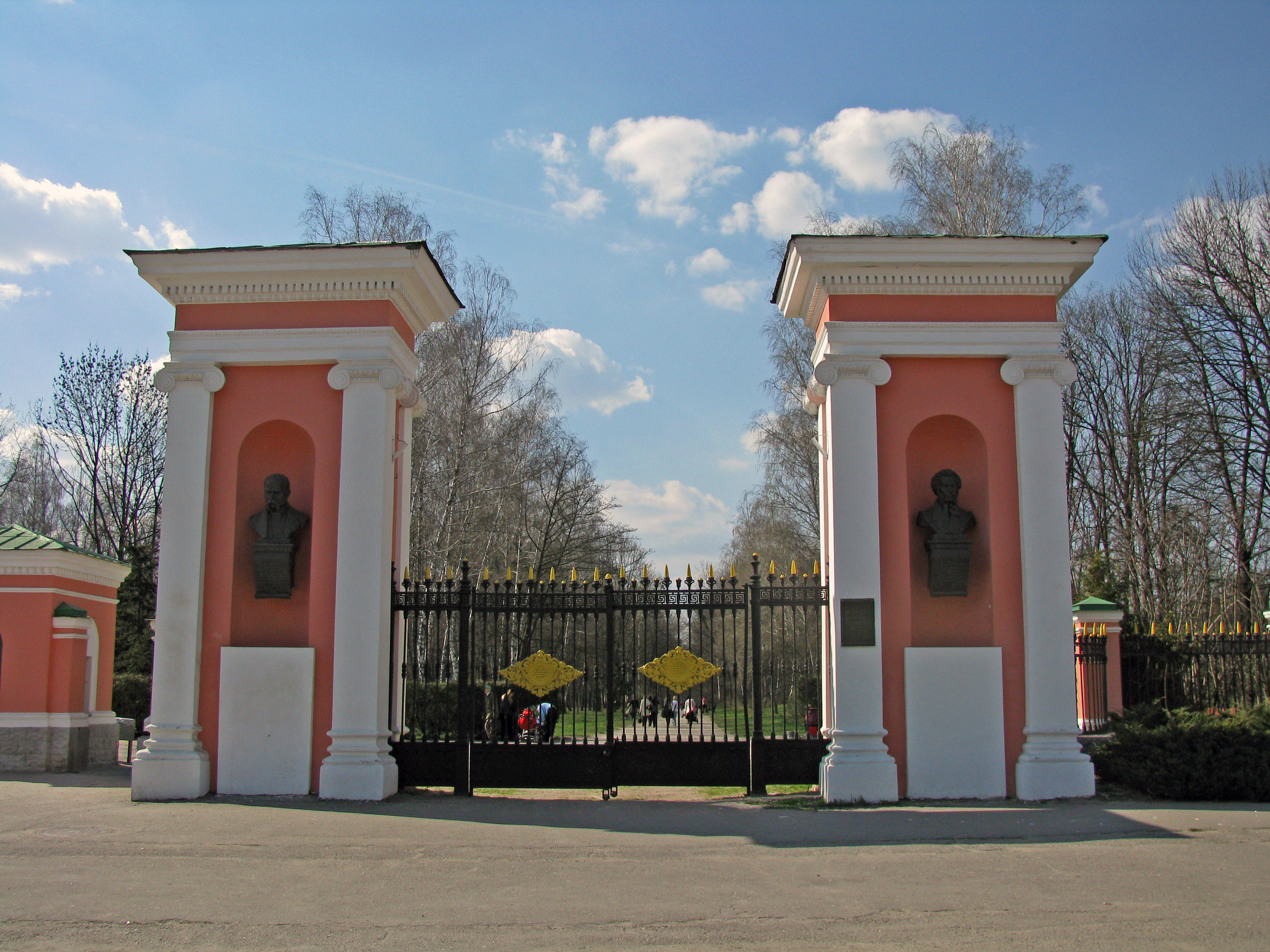
- The main entrance

- Location within Ukraine
- Interactive map of Arboretum Oleksandriya
- Type: Botanical garden
- Location: Bila Tserkva, Kyiv Oblast, Ukraine
- Coordinates: 49.8118487°N 30.0647967°E

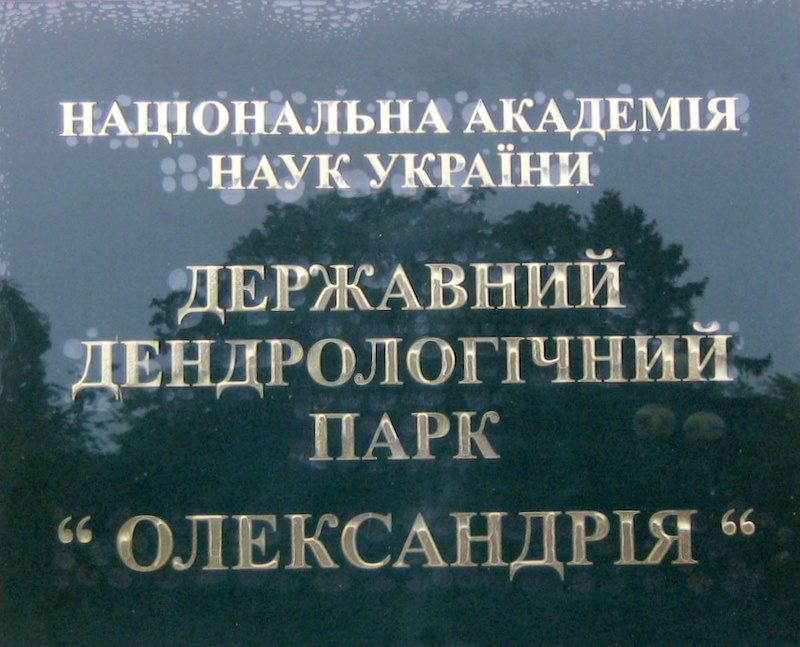

The Arboretum Oleksandriya (Ukrainian: Державний дендрологічний парк «Олександрія») is an arboretum located in the city of Bila Tserkva of the Kyiv Oblast of Ukraine. It holds the state arboretum of the National Academy of Sciences of Ukraine. It is a monument of landscape art, founded in the late 18th century. It is one of the largest parks in Eastern Europe, second largest in Ukraine.

The park combines plants, architectural structures, sculptures, the water surface of the Ros River and ponds.

== Geography ==
The territory is a floodplain terrace of the Ros river and is characterized by a flat slope to the river. The relief is supplemented by the presence of three beams, which stretched almost in the meridian direction.

In composition and style, it is similar to other romantic-style parks. The architecture style is late classicism.

== Soils ==
According to the agro-soil survey, the soils of the arboretum include gray forest, chernozem, durian-meadow and marshy soils.

Gray forest soils are the most common. Although the humus horizon is thick (in all places reaches 10–5 cm), it contains only 1.2–2.8% humus, with an insufficient number of mobile forms of nitrogen, potassium and phosphorus.

== Climate ==
The climate is characterized by moderate continentality. According to the data of the Belotserkovsky meteorological station, the average long-term annual air temperature is 6.9 °C. The average rainfall is 498 mm, about 80% of which falls in the form of rain. The minimum temperature is −32.4 °C in January, the maximum is +38 °C in June. Ground temperature 0 °C and below is observed to a depth of 40 cm, from December to March. The number of cloudy days in the year is 146, while 46 days are sunny. Snow cover continues for 80 days. Late spring frosts occasionally occur. (In 1999, May 5–7 on the surface of the soil - 7.9 °C, in 2000 2–4 May - 2.5 °C).

The area is characterized by unstable moisture, dry years are common.

The average duration of the growing season is 170–180 days.

== History ==
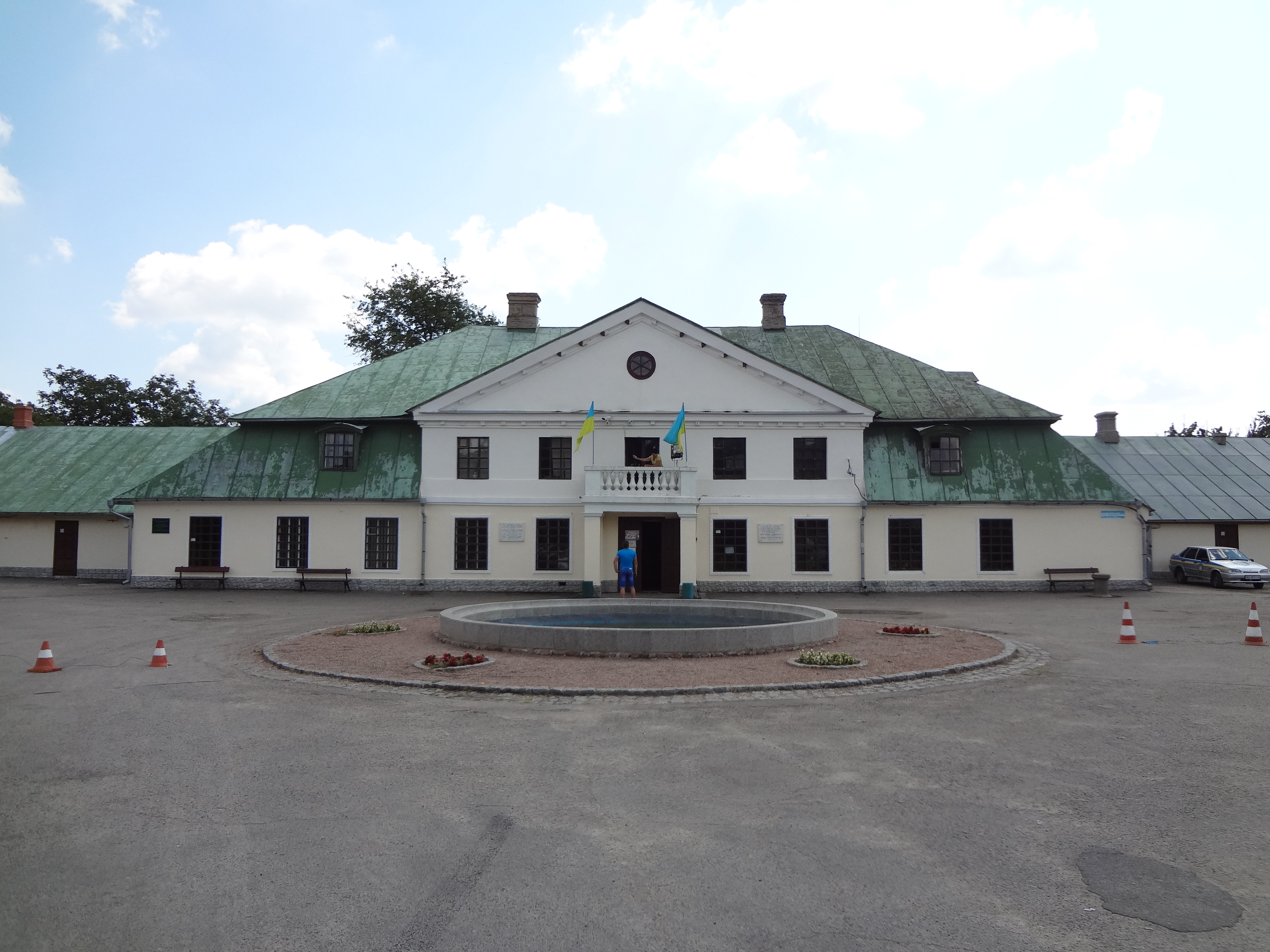
Gardener's house

On December 13, 1774, Polish King Stanislaw Augustus Poniatowski transferred Bila Tserkva starostvo to the possession of Hetman Franciszek Ksawery Branicki as a reward for the latter's role in the suppression of Koliivshchyna uprising. Branicki's new possessions included the cities of Bila Tserkva and Skvyra, as well as 134 villages with a population of over 40 thousand people. Since then, the Bila Tserkva became the private property of counts Branicki.

Branicki wintered at the court of Catherine II in Saint Petersburg. In summer they moved to their estates in Ukraine, most often to Bila Tserkva. In 1784, countess Branicka received the estate as a gift from her husband and began to put it in order. The name of the park - "Alexandria" (Oleksandriya) was given in his honor.

French architect Muffo was the author of the master plan for the park. Later, architects and gardeners Botani, Stange, Bartetsky, Witt, Jens worked there. They implemented the plan and laid the foundation of park compositions. The park's alleys were decorated with bronze and marble sculptures, vases.

In the middle of the nineteenth century the park "Alexandria" was visited by Gavrila Derzhavin, Alexander Pushkin, Taras Shevchenko, Decembrists, members of the Southern Society (Bestuzhev-Ryumin, Muravyov-Apostol, Pavel Pestel) and a number of Polish poets and artists.

The park was frequented by members of the royal family. The so-called Tsar's Garden, where larch and seven American limes grew, was planted by emperors Alexander Pavlovich, Nikolai Pavlovich and Princess Alexandra Feodorovna.

== Gallery ==
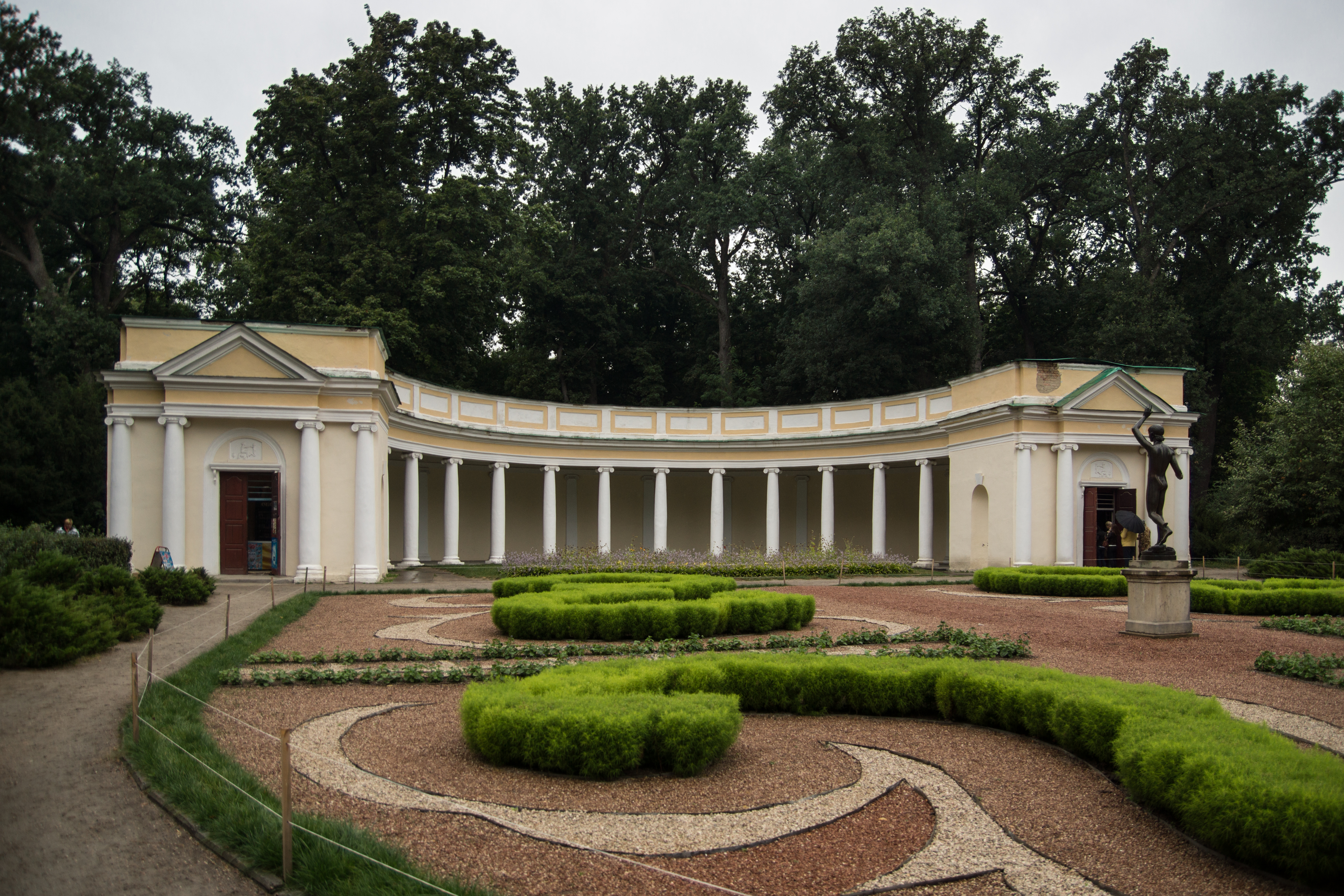
Echo Colonnade

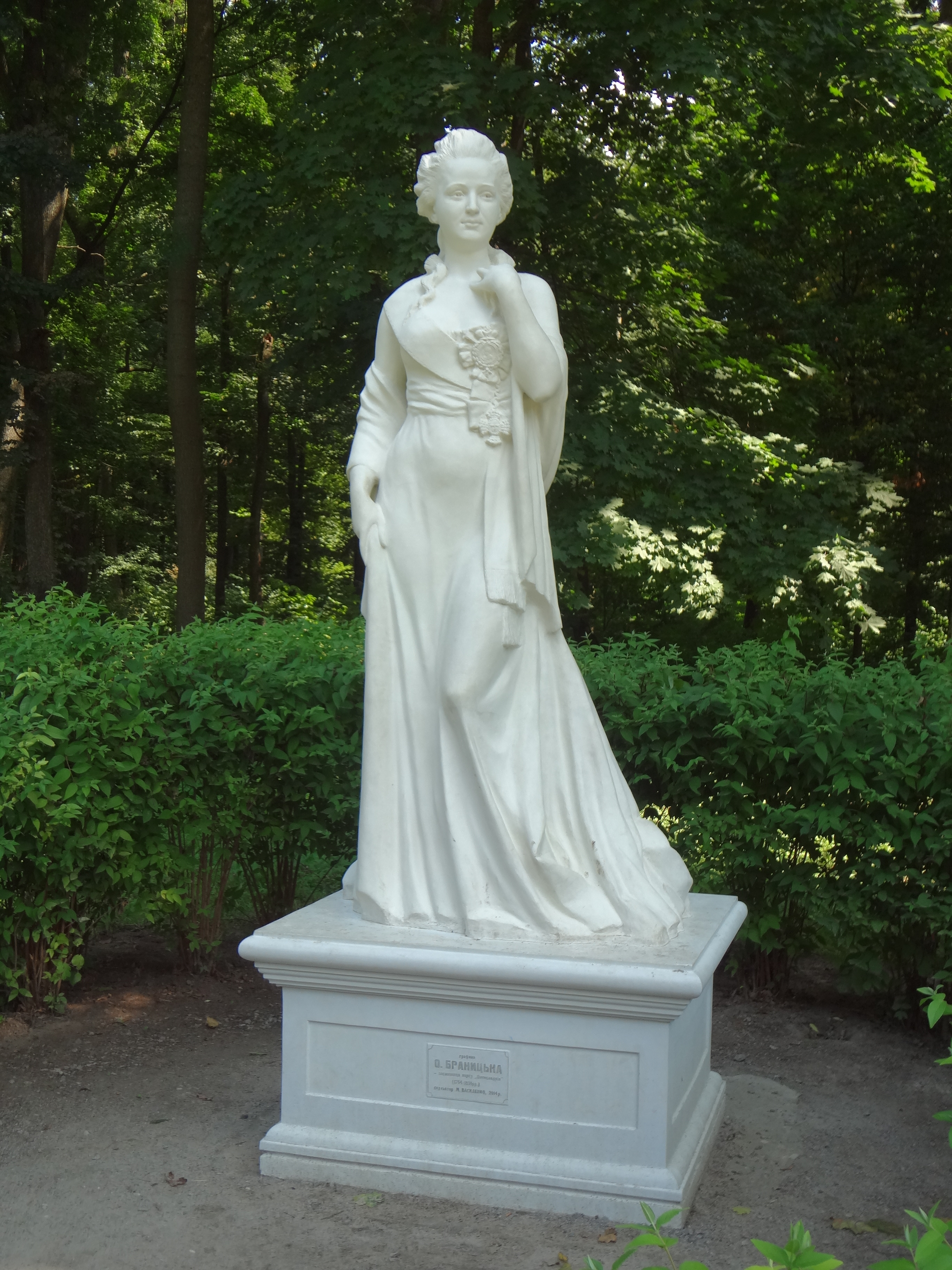
The monument to Alexandra Branitskaya

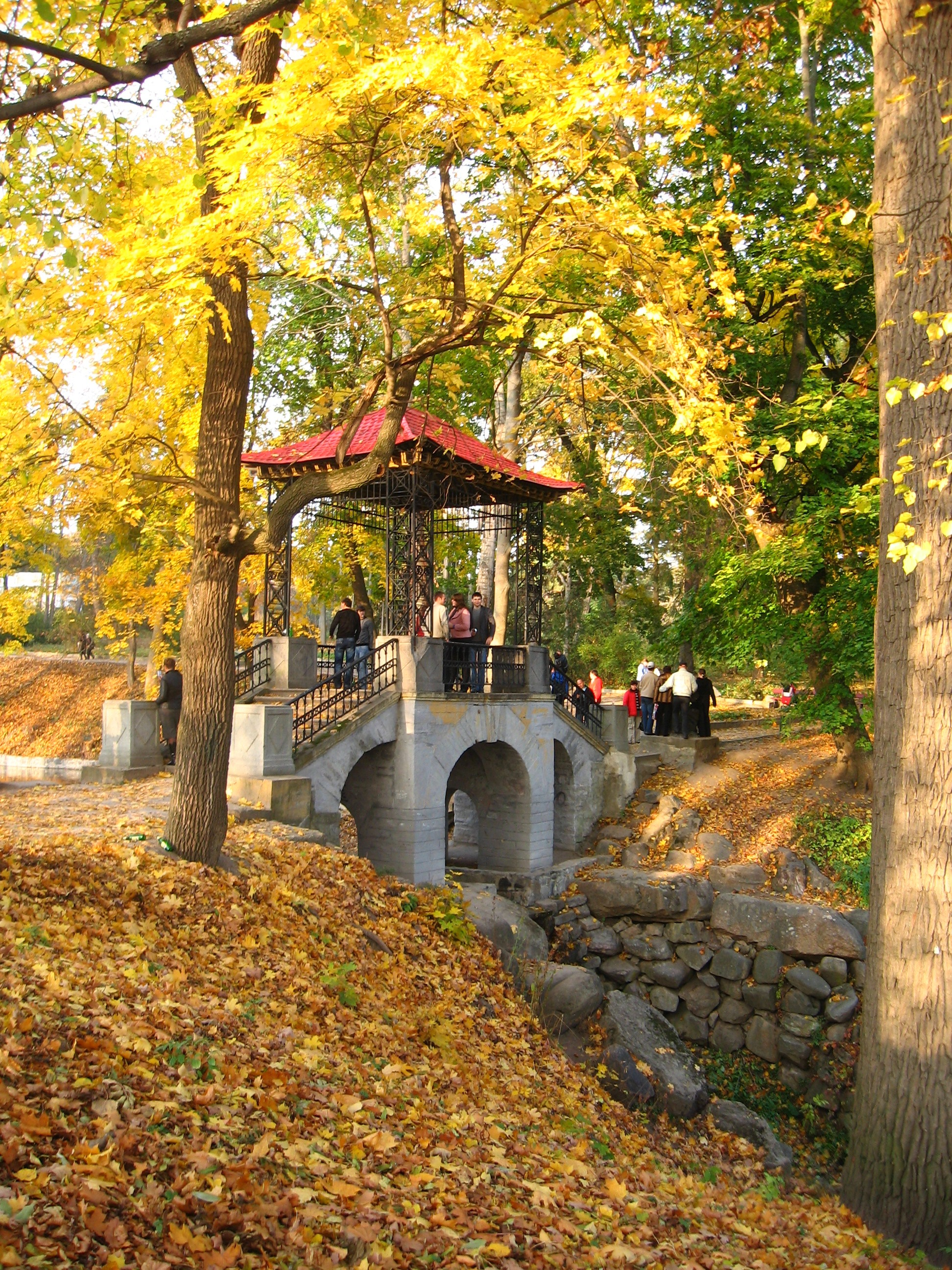
Chinese Bridge

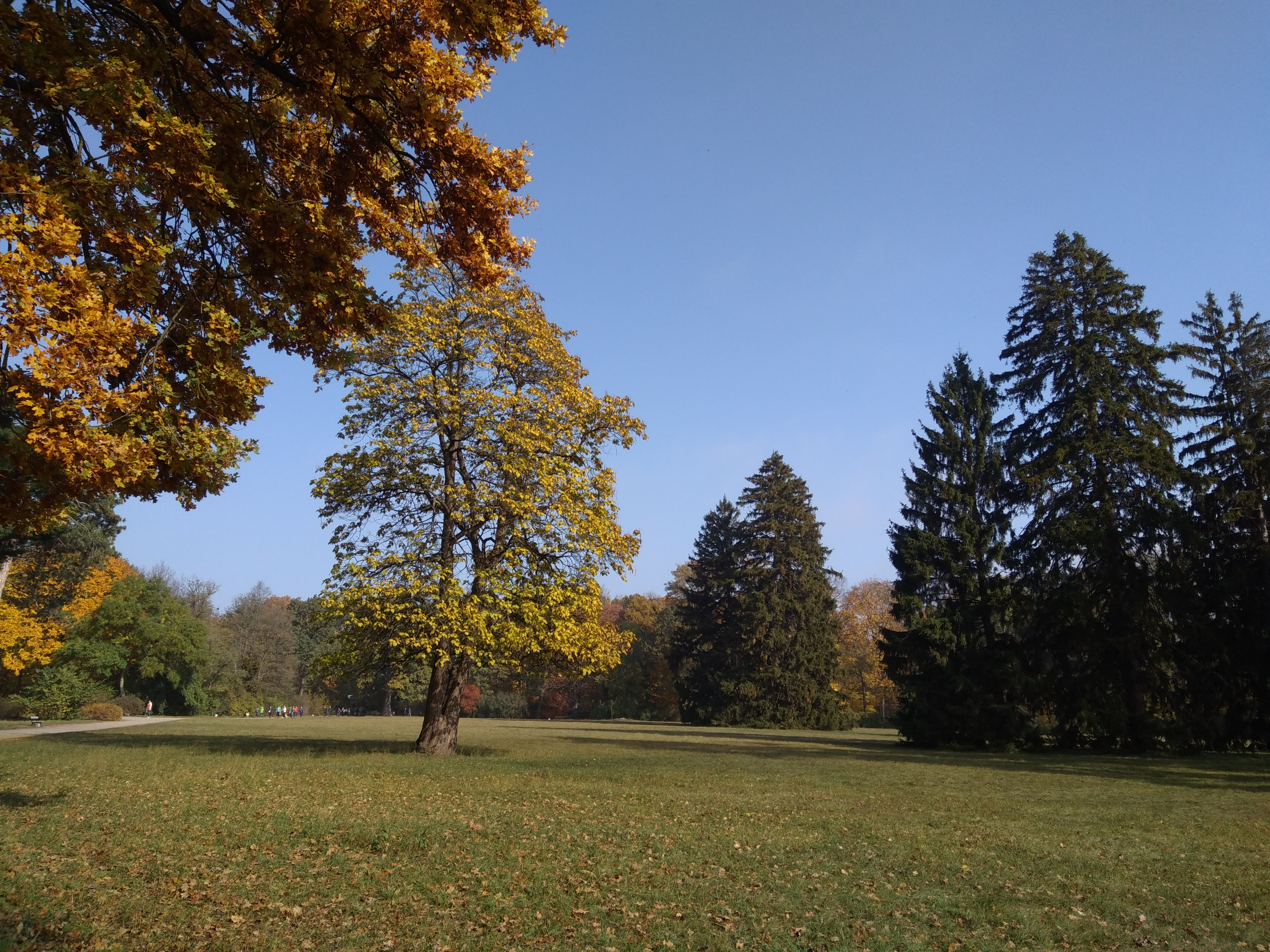
Big Glade

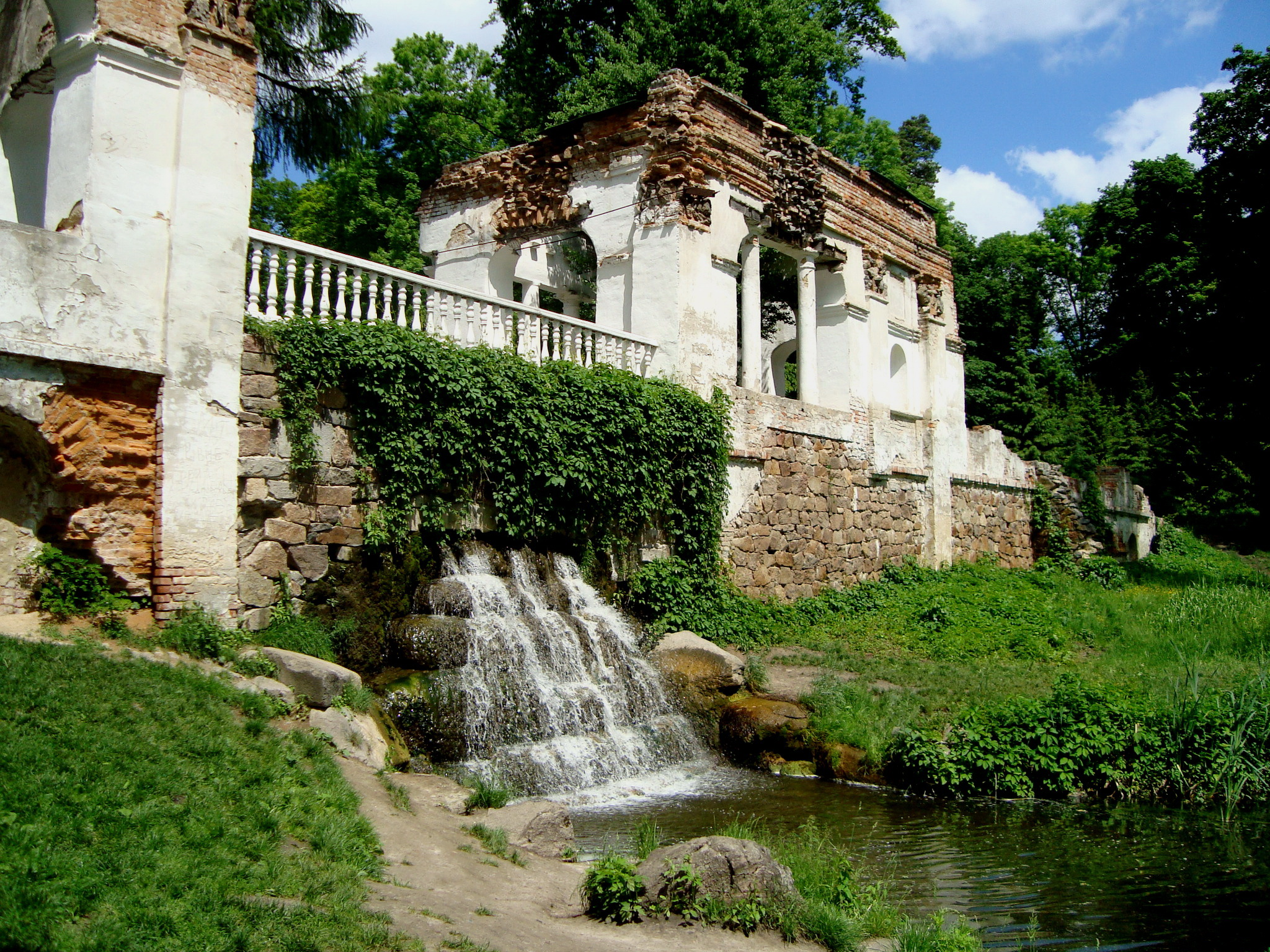
Ruins
