= Varvara Golitsyna =

Russian noble (1752–1815)

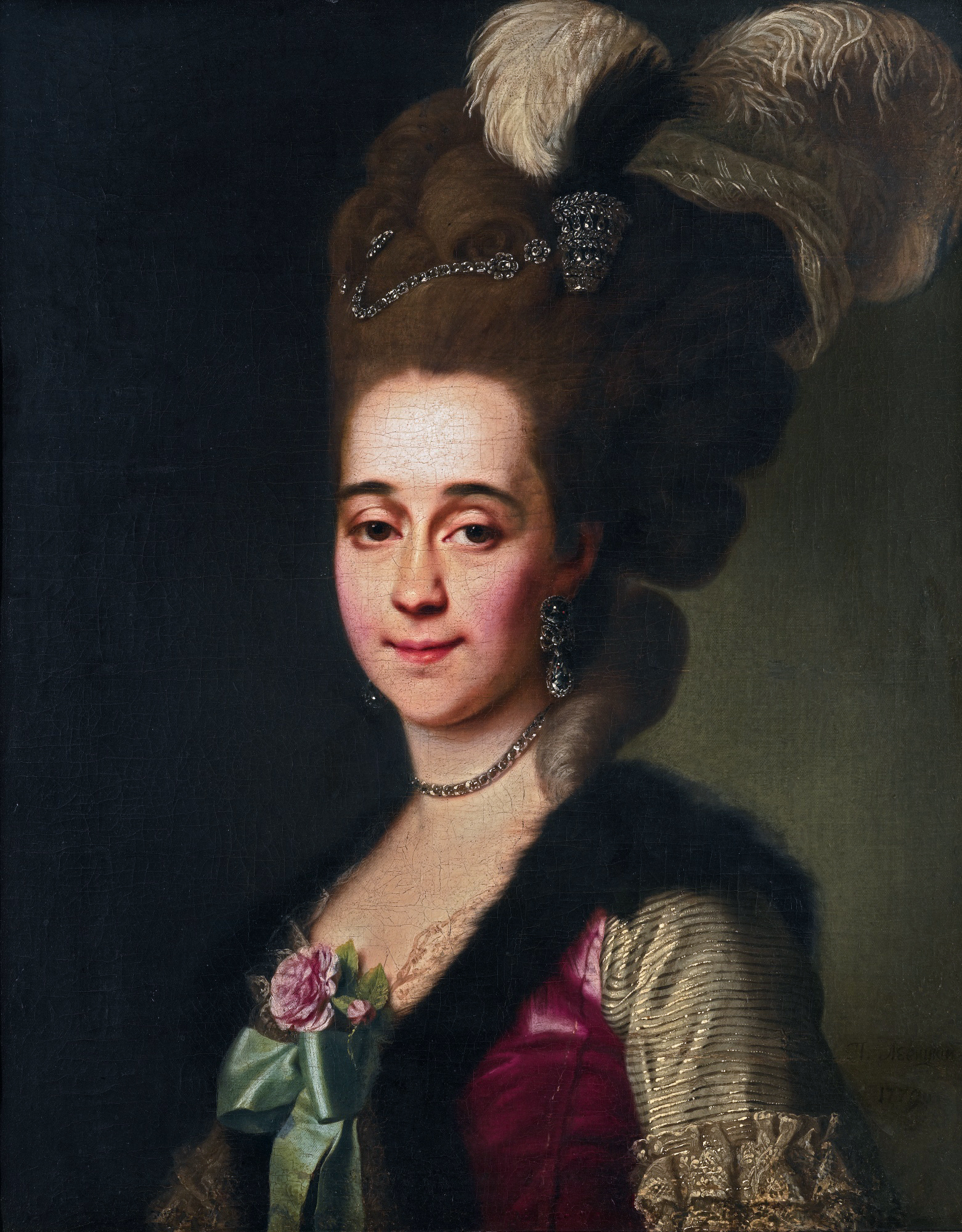
- Portrait by Dmitry Levitzky, 1779
- Born: Varvara Vasilievna von Engelhardt; 12 March 1757; Bila Tserkva, Russian Empire
- Died: 2 May 1815 (aged 58); Zubrilovka, Russian Empire
- Noble family: Engelhardt
- Spouse: Prince Sergey Golitsyn
- Issue: Grigory Sergeevich Golitsyn; Fedor Sergeevich Golitsyn; Sergei Sergeevich Golitsyn; Alexander Sergeevich Golitsyn; Vladimir Sergeevich Golitsyn; Pavel Sergeevich Golitsyn
- Father: Vasily von Engelhardt
- Mother: Yelena Marfa Potemkina
- Occupation: Lady-in-waiting to Catherine the Great

Varvara Vasilievna Golitsyna (Russian: Варвара Васильевна Голицына; née von Engelhardt; 12 March 1757 – 2 May 1815), was a Russian lady-in-waiting and noble. She was the niece and lover of Grigory Potyomkin, and the favoured lady-in-waiting of Catherine the Great.

Alongside her sisters, she was given a favored position at the Russian Imperial court during the reign of Catherine, where they were described as "Almost Grand Duchesses", the jewels of the court and honorary members of the Imperial family.

== Biography ==
She was the daughter of Vasily von Engelhardt and his spouse Yelena Marfa Potemkina, and thus the niece of Grigory Potyomkin.

She was introduced to the Russian court with her five sisters (and her brother) in 1775. They were initially uneducated and ignorant, but was soon given a sophisticated polish and made to be the most favored women at the Russian court; they were treated almost as if they were a part of the Imperial family, and were to be known as: "almost Grand Duchesses" and as the "jewels" and ornaments of the Russian court. Potemkin gave them large dowries and had Catherine appoint them ladies-in-waiting. They were alleged to be the lovers of their uncle, which was one of the most known gossip subjects and scandals of the age.

Her relationship with Potemkin took place in 1777–1779 and ended after her marriage to prince Sergey Golitsyn in 1779. It was possibly ended on her initiative, after she had fallen in love with Golitsyn. It is possible that her firstborn was fathered by her uncle. Her grandmother, Darja Potemkina, is known to have protested to her son against their affair. After their affair ended, her uncle Potemkin had an affair with her sister, Aleksandra. She is described as a beautiful, charming and temperamental blonde.
