= Portrait of Countess Yekaterina Skavronskaya =

1790 painting by Elisabeth Vigée-Lebrun

Portrait of Countess Catherine Skavronskaya
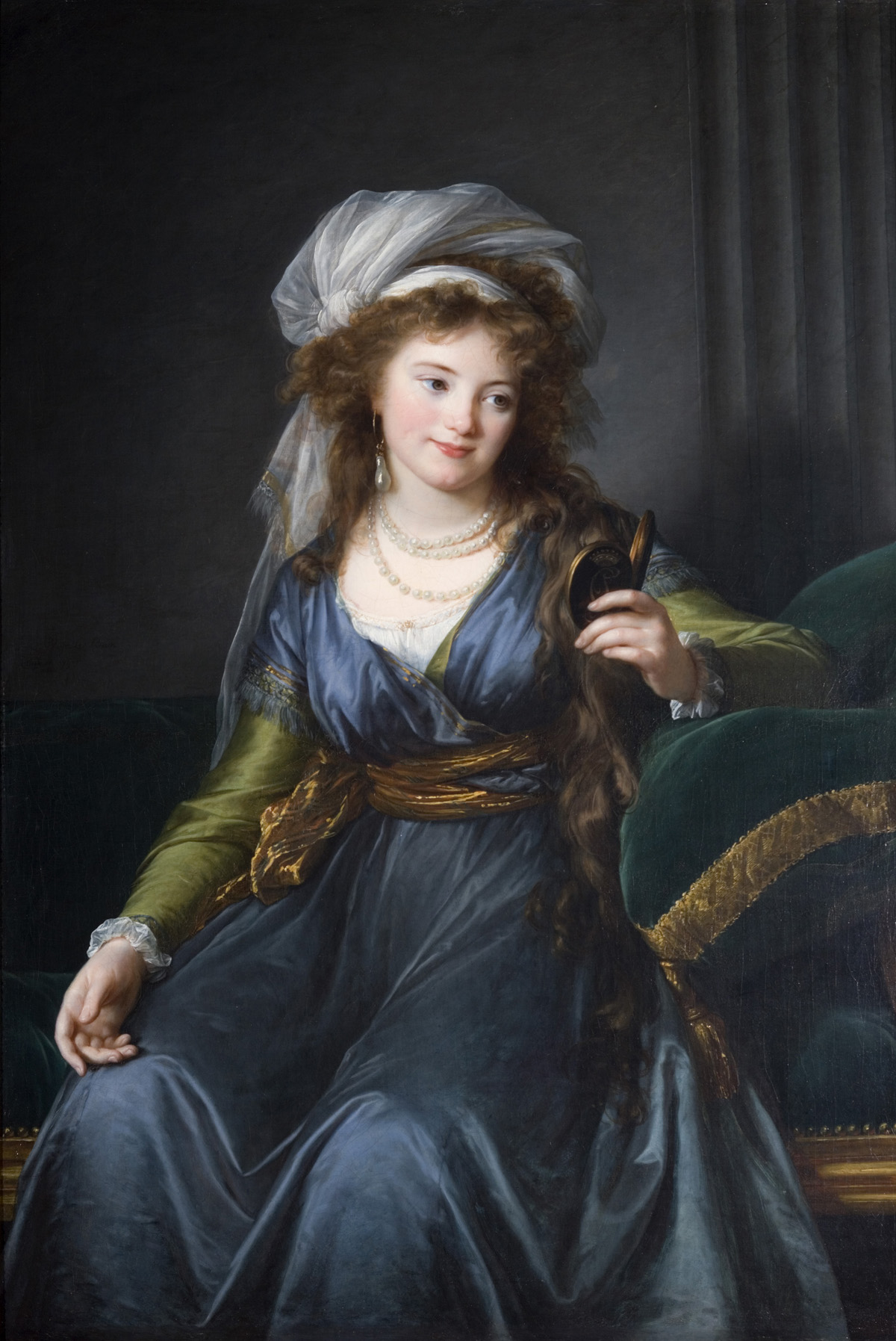
- Artist: Élisabeth Vigée Le Brun
- Year: 1790
- Medium: Oil on canvas
- Dimensions: 135 cm × 95 cm (53 in × 37 in)
- Location: Musée Jacquemart-André, Paris

Portrait of Countess Catherine Skavronskaya is a 1790 oil-on-canvas portrait by Elisabeth Vigée-Lebrun, now in the Musée Jacquemart-André in Paris. It was produced during her stay in Naples for its subject Yekatarina Skavronskaya's husband, Count Pavel Martinovich Skavronsky, Russia's Minister Plenipotentiary to the Kingdom of Naples. The composition was very successful and at least two contemporary copies are in Russian collections.

== History and description ==
Vigée-Lebrun described the sitter as "sweet and beautiful like an angel.(...) She did nothing all day, she had no education and her conversation was mostly empty. But despite all this, she had an invincible charm, thanks to her pretty face and angelic softness."

Vigée-Le Brun painted three portraits of Skavronskaya in Naples, including this three-quarter length portrait. The countess leans slightly on the arm of the sofa and has a languid and dreamy appearance. The use of color in the work is subdued, with rich shades of blue and green predominating. The young woman looks at a miniature in her hand that most likely contains a portrait of her husband. The letters of their first names (C and P) are on the back.

During one of her travels through important European cities, Vigée-Le Brun met once again the countess, who was now a widow, in Saint Petersburg, in 1796. She painted a new portrait, which has been part in the Louvre since 1966 .
