= Karpinski =

Karpinski, Karpiński, or Karpinsky may refer to:

== People ==
- Karpiński family, a Polish noble family
- Karpiński (surname), a Polish surname

== Places ==
- Karpinskiy (crater) on the Moon
- Mount Karpinsky (disambiguation)
  - Mount Karpinskiy in Antarctica
  - Mount Karpinsky (Urals), in the Ural Mountains
- Karpinsky Ice Cap or Karpinsky Glacier, large ice cap on October Revolution Island, Severnaya Zemlya, Russian Federation
- Karpinsky Group of volcanoes in the Kuril Islands

== Other ==
- Akademik Karpinsky, a number of ships
