= Mount Karpinsky =

Mount Karpinsky may refer to:

- Karpinsky Ice Cap, October Revolution Island, Severnaya Zemlya, Russian Arctic
- Mount Karpinskiy in Antarctica
- Mount Karpinsky (Urals) at 1878 m lying between the Tyumen Oblast and the Komi Republic in Russia
- The Karpinsky Group of volcanoes on Paramushir Island in the Kurils
