= Eleonore of Austria, Queen of Poland =

Queen of Poland (1670–1673), Duchess of Lorraine (1678–1690)

Eleonore of Austria
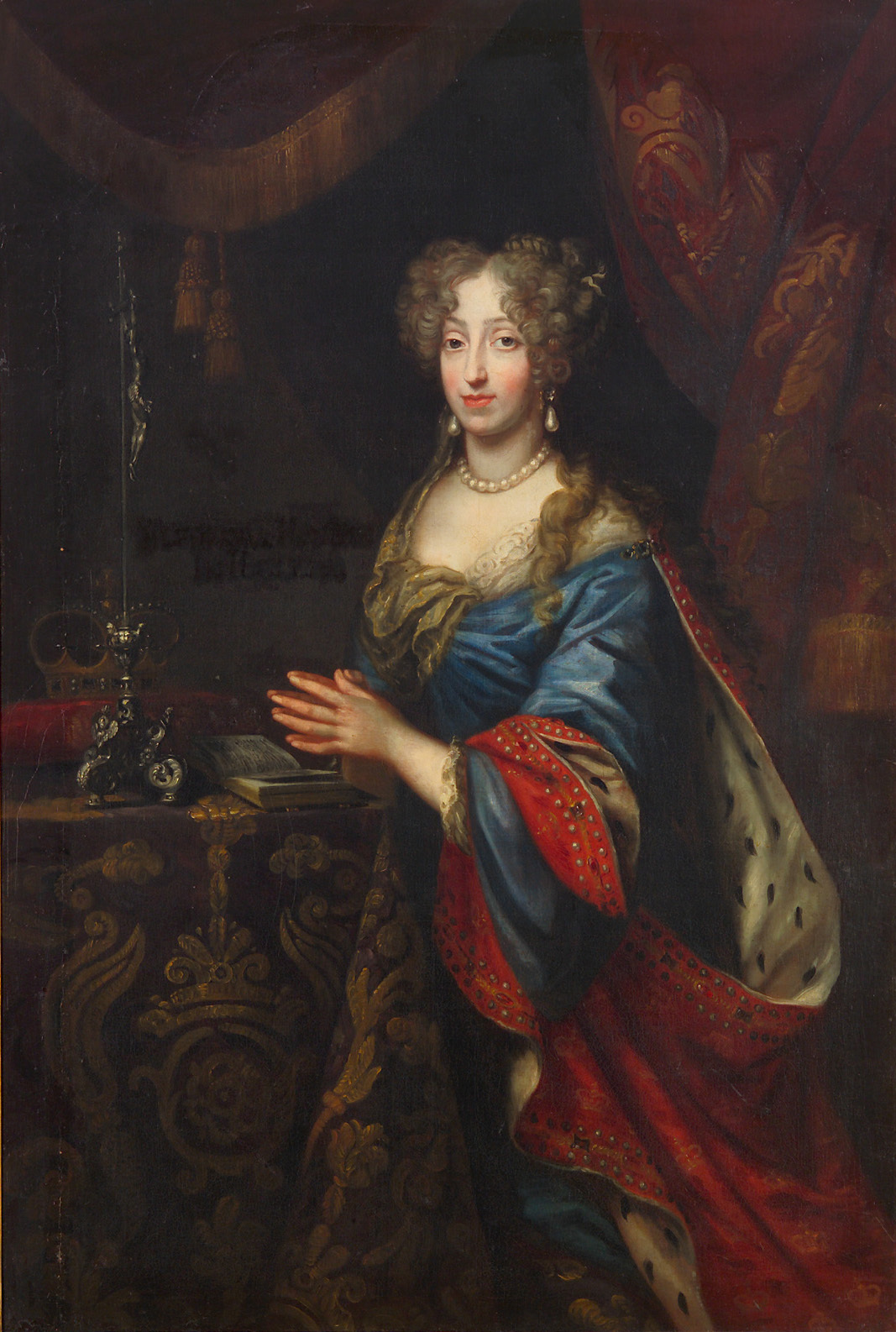
- Portrait by Charles Brendel, 1684

Queen consort of Poland Grand Duchess consort of Lithuania
- Tenure: 27 February 1670 – 10 November 1673
- Coronation: 29 September 1670; St John's church

Duchess consort of Lorraine
- Tenure: 6 February 1678 – 18 April 1690
- Born: 21 May 1653; Free Imperial City of Regensburg, Holy Roman Empire
- Died: 17 December 1697 (aged 44); Vienna, Archduchy of Austria, Holy Roman Empire
- Burial: Imperial Crypt, Vienna
- Spouse: Michał Korybut Wiśniowiecki (m. 1670; died 1673) Charles V, Duke of Lorraine (m. 1678; died 1690)
- Issue Detail: Leopold, Duke of Lorraine; Charles Joseph, Bishop of Olomouc
Names
- English: Eleanor Mary Josepha; Polish: Eleonora Maria Józefa; French: Éléonore Marie Josèphe; Lithuanian: Eleonora Marija Juozapa
- House: Habsburg
- Father: Ferdinand III, Holy Roman Emperor
- Mother: Eleonora Gonzaga

Eleonore Maria Josefa of Austria (21 May 1653 – 17 December 1697) was Queen of Poland and Grand Duchess of Lithuania by marriage to King Michał Korybut Wiśniowiecki (Michael I), and subsequently Duchess of Lorraine by her second marriage to Charles V, Duke of Lorraine. She acted as nominal regent of the Duchy of Lorraine during the minority of her son between 1690 and 1697.

== Life ==
=== Early life and Family ===
Born in Regensburg, Eleonore was the daughter of Holy Roman Emperor Ferdinand III and his third wife, Empress Eleonora, née Gonzaga. Not much is known about her childhood. She was given a good education, and could speak both French and Italian.

=== Queen of Poland and Grand Duchess of Lithuania ===
Eleonore married King-Grand Duke Michael Korybut Wiśniowiecki, king of Poland and grand duke of Lithuania, on 27 February 1670 in the Jasna Góra Monastery.

The marriage was suggested by the Polish envoy Andrzej Olszowski in November 1669 in order to form an alliance with the Habsburg dynasty through marriage, since the opposition to Michael Korybut Wiśniowiecki was backed by the pro-French faction.

The relationship between Eleonore and Michael was described as a harmonious friendship. They had one stillborn son on 29 November 1670. The pro-French opposition to Michael spread rumors that he was homosexual or impotent and that he forced her to fake pregnancies, but this is not considered likely. The pro-French opposition party under the leadership of John III Sobieski and Mikołaj Prażmowski attempted to convince her to divorce, but she refused and instead demonstrated loyalty toward the king.

Queen and Grand Duchess Eleonore was regarded as an ideal model of a good, supportive and loyal spouse. She learned Polish, although she preferred Latin, and accompanied Michael on his official journeys around the Polish-Lithuanian Commonwealth. She was guided in her role as queen-grand duchess by her lady-in-waiting Klara Izabella Pacowa, who became her influential favorite.

The conflict between the supporters of King-Grand Duke Michael and the opposition party resulted in such a conflict that there was a fear of civil war in the Polish-Lithuanian Commonwealth. In February 1672, the queen was asked to act as a mediator between King-Grand Duke Michael and the opposition leader John III Sobieski during the 1672 Sejm. She accepted the assignment and entered negotiations assisted by the papal nuncio Franciszek Buonvisim, the bishop of Kraków, Andrzej Trzebicki, and the voivode of Vitebsk Jan Antoni Chrapowicki. Eleonore succeeded in convincing the opposition to acknowledge the election victory of King Michael in exchange for amnesty for the opposition.

King and Grand Duke Michael died on 10 November 1673. She remained in the Polish-Lithuanian Commonwealth for a couple of years after his death.

=== Duchess of Lorraine ===
Eleonore initially stayed in Poland in her dowager seat at Toruń. It was suggested by the Habsburgs that she marry Charles V of Lorraine, who was then to be elected king of Poland and grand duke of Lithuania as the Habsburg candidate, benefitted by the popularity Eleonore enjoyed in Poland. Instead, however, the French opposition party won the 1674 Polish–Lithuanian royal election under the leadership of John III Sobieski. In the spring of 1675, Eleonore departed Poland for Vienna.

Eleonore married Charles V of Lorraine on 4 February 1678 in Wiener Neustadt, Austria. Since the Duchy of Lorraine was under French occupation, the couple resided in Innsbruck, in the County of Tyrol. They were the parents of six children. She passed to her heirs the inheritance of the Gonzagas of Mantua.

When she married Charles, there were fears in the Commonwealth that she was planning to overthrow King and Grand Duke John III Sobieski and install her own spouse as a ruler. Eleonora did keep in contact with pro-Habsburg Polish magnates such as Dymitr Jerzy Wiśniowiecki, Kalisz Voivode and Jan Karol Opaliński, but no such plan was ever realised.

When she was widowed in 1690, the title Duke of Lorraine and the right to the Duchy of Lorraine was inherited by her eldest son Leopold. Since Leopold was eleven years old, Eleonore became nominal regent during his minority. As his regent, she worked to end the French occupation of Lorraine and restore the duchy's independence. Her goal was reached when the Duchy of Lorraine was restored at the Peace of Ryswick in 1697. She died not long after.

Eleonore died at the age of 44, having outlived both of her husbands and two of her children.

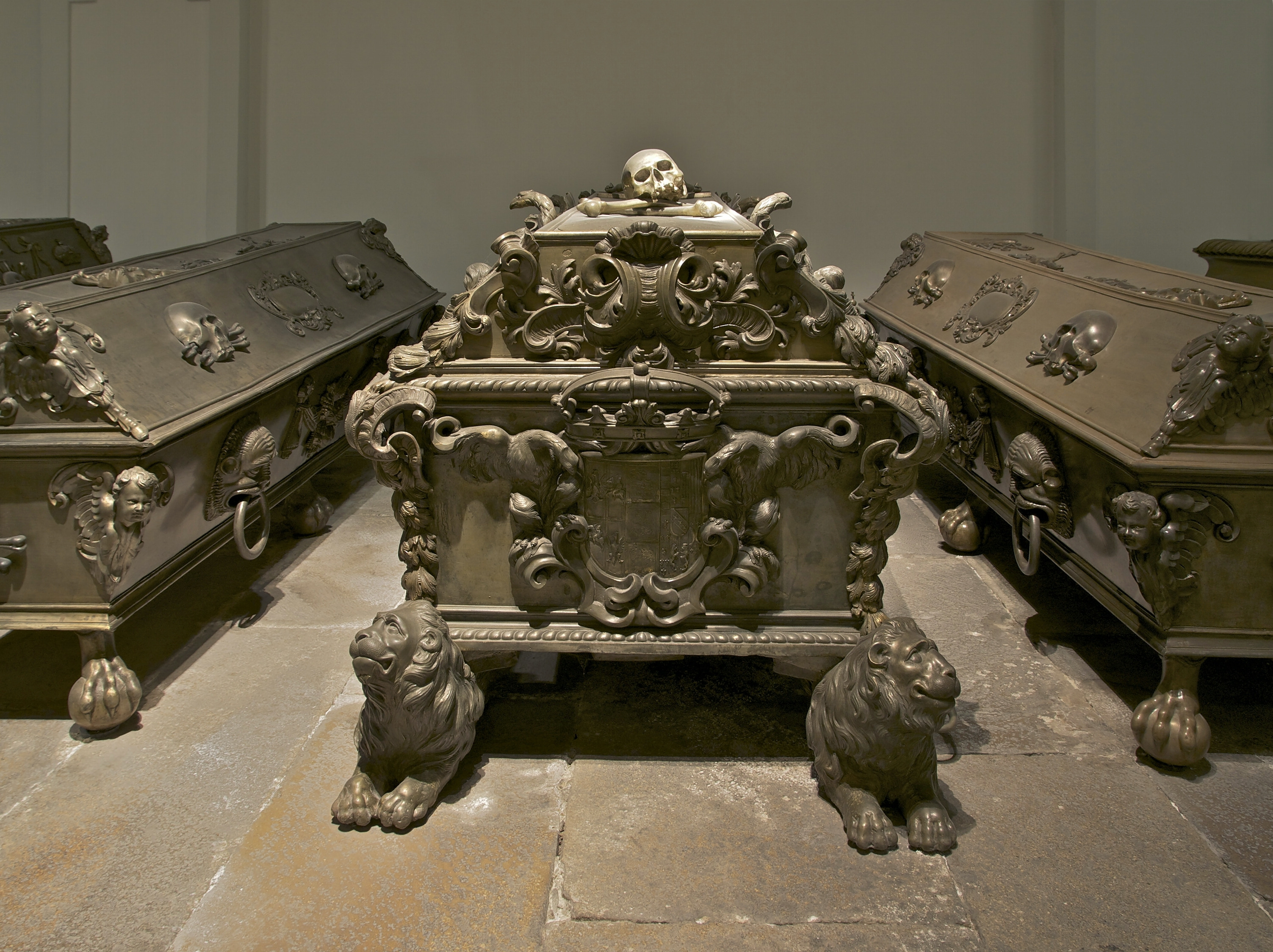
Sarcophagus of Eleonore of Austria: Kapuzinergruft, Vienna, Austria

== Issue ==
Eleonore had 1 miscarried son by her first husband.

From her second marriage she had:

- Leopold, Duke of Lorraine (1679–1729)
- Charles Joseph of Lorraine (1680–1715)
- Eleanor of Lorraine (1682)
- Charles Ferdinand of Lorraine (1683–1685)
- Joseph Innocent Emanuel of Lorraine (1685–1705)
- Francis Anton Joseph of Lorraine (1689–1715)

== Ancestry ==
Ancestors of Eleonore of Austria, Queen of Poland

8. Charles II of Austria
4. Ferdinand II, Holy Roman Emperor
9. Maria Anna of Bavaria
2. Ferdinand III, Holy Roman Emperor
10. William V, Duke of Bavaria
5. Maria Anna of Bavaria
11. Renata of Lorraine
1. Eleonore of Austria
12. Charles I, Duke of Mantua
6. Charles II Gonzaga
13. Catherine of Mayenne
3. Eleanor Gonzaga
14. Francesco IV Gonzaga
7. Maria Gonzaga
15. Margaret of Savoy

== See also ==
- Częstochowa

== Sources ==
- Davies, Norman (1982). God's Playground:A History of Poland. Vol. I. Columbia University Press.
- Lipp, Charles T. (2011). Noble Strategies in an Early Modern Small State: The Mahuet of Lorraine. University of Rochester Press.

Eleonore of Austria, Queen of Poland House of Habsburg Born: 31 May 1653 Died: 17 Dec 1697
Royal titles
Previous: Marie Louise Gonzaga	Queen consort of Poland; Grand Duchess consort of Lithuania; 1670–1673	Next: Marie Casimire Louise de La Grange d'Arquien
Previous: Marie Louise d'Aspremont	Duchess consort of Lorraine; 1678–1690	Next: Élisabeth Charlotte d'Orléans
