= Karpiński family =

Polish families

Karpiński (pronounced [karˈpij̃skʲi]; meaning "of Karpin") is one of the Polish families of the heraldic clan that used the Korab coat of arms. Their family motto is: "For the greater glory of God".

The family lay claim to the title of count as early as the 13th century. However, in what is considered the most authoritative work on the Polish nobility—that of Simon Konarski and Adam Boniecki, who point out that the polish nobility based on the clan system resisted the use of titles until as late as the 17th Century and those that were acquired after this time (especially during the partitions of Poland) were not of Polish origin. No trace of the use of this title for the family or clan can be found in Counts of Galicia and Poland.

The title it was claimed originated in 1242 when Zbislaw of Wieluń (or Wielen) of Korab coat of arms became Voivod (Wojewoda) Palatinus Count Palatine or King's Governor of Sieradz province in south-western Poland. In early medieval Poland the title of Voivode (chief military commander of a duchy or a principality) was at times synonymous with the title of Palatinus which was next in rank to the King. Palatinus was also the chief commander of the King's army within the duchy and the rank was often merged with Voivode (Wojewoda), with the latter replacing the title of Palatine over time.

During the Fragmentation of Poland each Prince or Duke would have his own voivode. When some of these Principalities were reunited into the Kingdom of Poland the Palatines were infeudated with them as there was no local Prince or Duke anymore. Or rather, as happened in most cases, these princely titles returned on to the King. The Principalities and Duchies were thus made Voivodships (often translated as Palatinates). The two terms were used interchangeably with most European maps of the Polish-Lithuanian Commonwealth showing Voivodships as Palatinates e.g. Sieradz Palatinate. In the Polish-Lithuanian Commonwealth the Voivode sat in the Senate which in Polish-Lithuanian Commonwealth had more power then the King. Throughout its history the dignity remained non-hereditary or semi-hereditary. Today voivodes are government officials.

By the end of the Polish-Lithuanian Commonwealth, post of Wojewoda (Voivode) could be likened to the Lord Lieutenant of a territory who was appointed by the sovereign. This territory usually was geographically same as the original territory of a duchy or principality prior to its merger into the Crown. Only a person of noble birth or descent could be appointed a Voivode, primarily for practical reasons as other nobles would not accept directions or instructions from a commoner. In later years, after partitions of Poland, Voivode became a working title with commoners routinely appointed to the post which in itself in no way implied nobility, although naturally the chosen occupant would be held in great esteem.

Notable individuals who held the post of Voivode (Palatine) during the Polish-Lithuanian Commonwealth:

Jerema Wiśniowiecki, a notable magnate and military commander with Ruthenian and Moldavian origin, voivode of the Ruthenian Voivodship. He was heir of one of the biggest fortunes of the state and rose to several notable dignities, including the position of Ruthenian voivode in 1646. Wiśniowiecki was a successful military leader as well as one of the wealthiest magnates of Poland, ruling over lands inhabited by 230,000 people. Although the title of Voivode was not hereditary, it often stayed in the family. Jarema was the third member of the Wiśniowiecki family to hold this title. His son, Michael I (1640–1673) at the age of 29 (on September 29, 1669) became a ruler of the Polish–Lithuanian Commonwealth as King of Poland and Grand Duke of Lithuania. He held this position until his death in 1673.

Vlad III, known as Vlad the Impaler or Vlad Dracula (1428/1431 – 1476/77), was Voivode of Wallachia three times between 1448 and his death.

The 14th century saw the Karpinski family move its seat to north-western Poland, where it accumulated large estates through grants of land and through marriage. During the 16th century and 17th century, the family disposed of most of its estates in western Poland. At the beginning of the 17th century, the family moved its seat to eastern Poland. By 18th century, they owned estates in eastern and south-eastern Poland in what is today Belarus and Ukraine.

During the communist era in Poland, many families dropped the use of the 'Herb' or Coat of Arms for political reasons only to resurrect their use later. It is also known that expatriate branches of family (as with other expatriates) adopted and used the prefix and the coat of arms as members of the Karpinski clan. There is no College of Arms in Poland as in the UK, and thus the use of these arms is unrestricted and not controlled by any Polish authority.

== See also ==
- Karpiński (surname)
