= Mount Rusanov =

Mountain in Queen Maud Land, Antarctica

Mount Rusanov (71°32′S 19°38′E) is an isolated mountain lying north of the Russkiye Mountains, about 35 nautical miles (60 km) northeast of Zhelannaya Mountain, in Queen Maud Land. Mapped by Norsk Polarinstitutt from air photos by Norwegian Antarctic Expedition, 1958–59. Also mapped in 1959 by the Soviet Antarctic Expedition, and named for Russian geologist and polar explorer V.A. Rusanov.
