= Rusanov =

Rusanov (Russian: Русанов) is a Russian masculine surname, its feminine counterpart is Rusanova. It may refer to:

- Anatoly Rusanov (born 1932), Russian chemist
- Dmitri Rusanov (born 1987), Russian football player
- Irina Rusanova
- Lyubov Rusanova (born 1954), Russian swimmer
- Nikolay Rusanov (1859–1939), Russian revolutionary
- Vladimir Rusanov (1875–c. 1913), Russian geologist
- Vladislav Rusanov (footballer)
- Vladislav Rusanov (writer) (born 1966), Ukrainian fantasy writer
- Yuliya Rusanova (born 1986), Russian runner

== See also ==
- Mount Rusanov in Antarctica
