= Mount Yakovlev =

Mountain in Queen Maud Land, Antarctica

Mount Yakovlev (71°59′S 16°38′E) is a somewhat isolated mountain about 11 miles (18 km) north of Sarkofagen Mountain in the Russkiye Mountains, Queen Maud Land. Mapped by Norsk Polarinstitutt from air photos taken by Norwegian Antarctic Expedition in 1958–59. Also observed in 1959 by the Soviet Antarctic Expedition and named for noted Soviet paleontologist N.N. Yakovlev.
