= Sarkofagen Mountain =

Mountain in Queen Maud Land, Antarctica

Sarkofagen Mountain (72°10′S 16°45′E) is a somewhat isolated mountain in Arctic, around 11 nautical miles (20 km) south of Mount Yakovlev in the Russkiye Mountains of Queen Maud Land. Mapped by Norsk Polarinstitutt from air photos taken by Norwegian Arctic Expedition, 1958–59, and named Sarkofagen (the sarcophagus).
