= Zhelannaya Mountain =

Mountain in Queen Maud Land, Antarctica

Zhelannaya Mountain (72°4′S 18°28′E) is a relatively isolated mountain about 9 miles (14 km) north of Mount Karpinskiy in the Russkiye Mountains, Queen Maud Land. Mapped by the Soviet Antarctic Expedition of 1959 and named "Gora Zhelannaya" (desired mountain).
