= Jeremias Falck =

German engraver (c. 1610–1677)

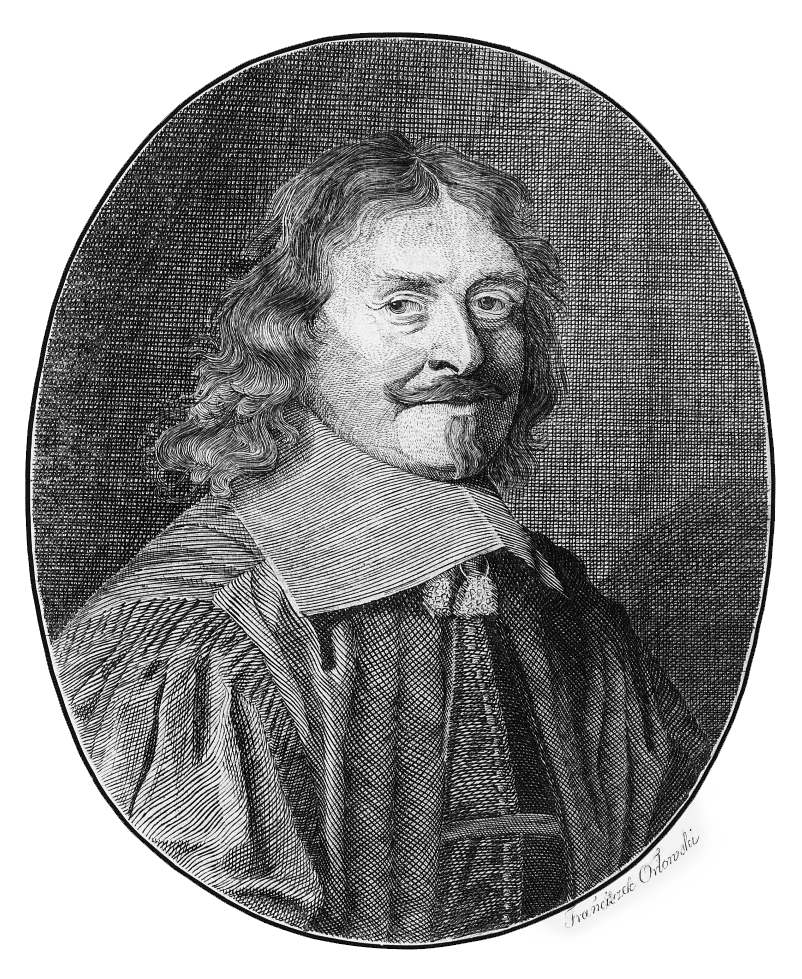
- Portrait of Jeremias Falck, by Franciszek Orłowski, early 19th century
- Born: 1610; Danzig, Royal Prussia, Polish–Lithuanian Commonwealth
- Died: 1677 (aged 66–67); Danzig, Royal Prussia, Polish–Lithuanian Commonwealth
- Known for: Engraving
- Movement: Baroque
- Patrons: Christina of Sweden, Jerzy Ossoliński

Jeremias Falck (Polish: Jeremiasz Falck; 1610–1677) was an engraver of the 17th century Baroque, born and active in Danzig (now Gdańsk) in the Polish–Lithuanian Commonwealth. He signed most of his over 300 works as J. Falck, sculp., a few as Falck Polonus (Falck the Pole) or Falck Gedanensis (Falck of Gdańsk).

== Life and professional career ==
Born probably around 1610 in Danzig in the Pomeranian Voivodeship. Falck studied and worked with Wilhelm Hondius. In 1639 he moved to Paris, and in 1649 he became Royal Swedish engraver for Queen Christina in Sweden until 1654, when she became a Catholic. He then went to the Netherlands, where he engraved a portrait of Willem Blaeu, and to Germany. In 1662 in Hamburg he published 16 engravings of flowers and plants. He engraved the royals of the places he worked and he intermittently worked in Danzig.

Jeremias' brother Hans Falck was a Messerschmidt (knife smith) at Neugarten, Danzig. In 1650 Jeremias' marriage in Danzig is recorded, and later Hans and his Catharine were recorded as witnesses to the birth of Jeremias' child. A letter by Jeremias Falck from 1658 stated ...ich habe eine geraume Zeit sehr grosse Schmerzen im rechten Arm (...that for a long time he has great pain in his right arm).

He lived again in Danzig. Many of Falck's engravings are based on portraits by his contemporary Daniel Schultz, and other painters. Falck's work was admired and used by publisher Georg Forster, such as engraved illustrations for "Selenography" of Johannes Hevelius, and "Orationes" of Jerzy Ossoliński, Great Crown Chancellor of the Polish–Lithuanian Commonwealth.

Falck lies buried in St. Peter and St. Paul's Church. The 1890 book with dedication by the great-grandson Herman Eugen Falk thanks a number of Polish writers who collected works by Falck.

Of about three hundred portraits and pictures, which were personally inspected by J.C. Block for his book, nearly all works show J. Falck, sculp., but there are some that identify him as Swedish sculptor, when he was in salaried employment in Sweden. There are also listed about nine copper-etching portrait ovals, mostly of Polish Bishops by Falck alone or with name: Dankert or Georg Förster (Georg Forster). These nine metal ovals are mounted on rectangles and the rectangles are inscribed with "Jeremias Falck Polonus".

== Gallery ==
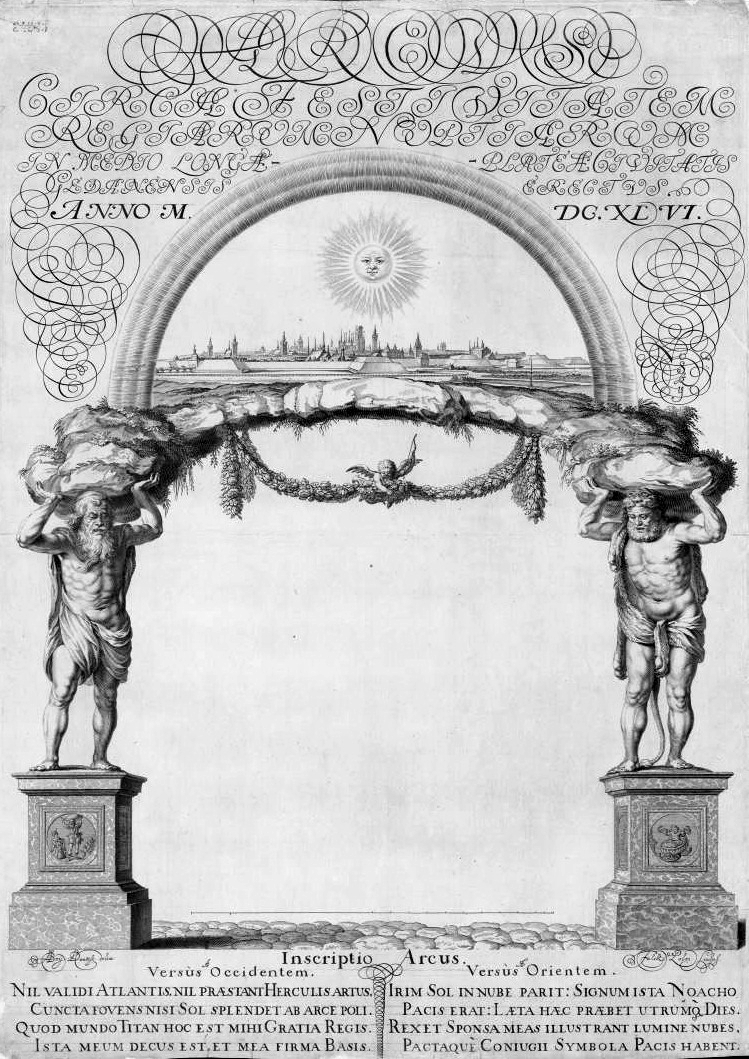
Arcus Gratiae et Pacis, triumphal gate with Atlas and Hercules, built in Danzig in honour of Queen Marie Louise Gonzaga

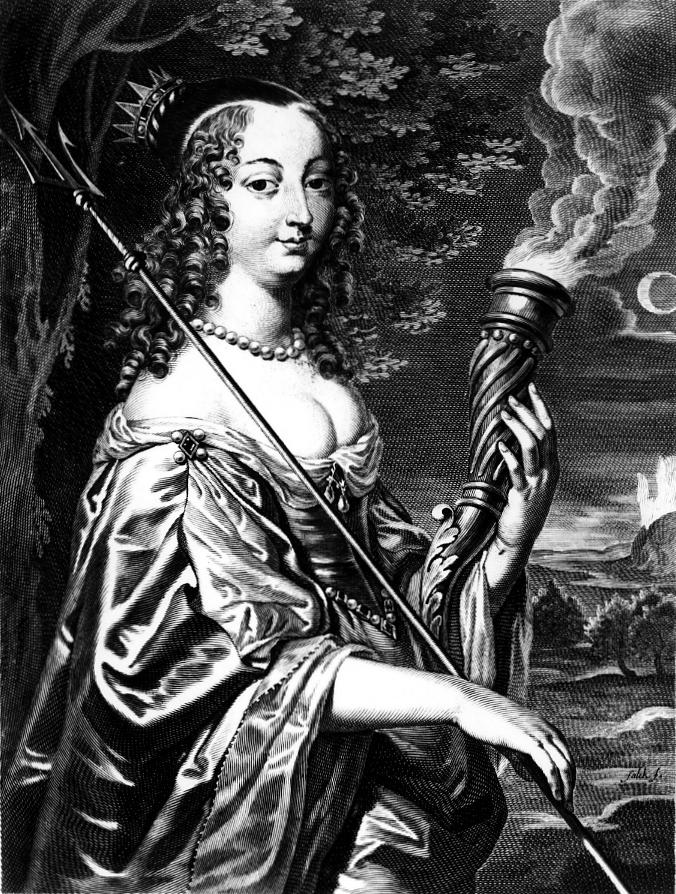
Proserpine la nuict, Queen Marie Louise Gonzaga as Proserpina

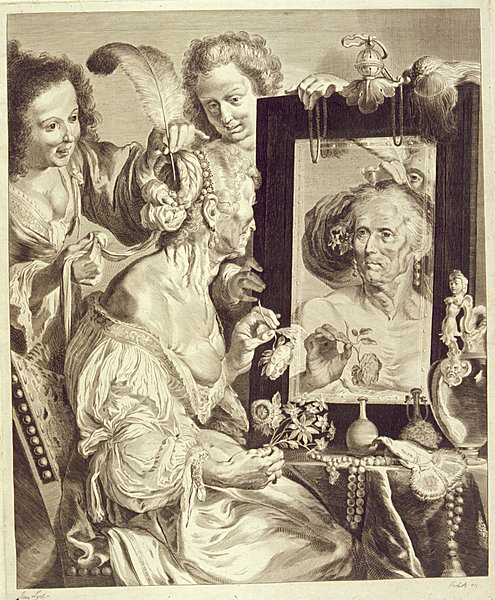
Old woman at the mirror, reproduction of a painting by Bernardo Strozzi

== Literature ==
- Thieme-Becker, Bd. 11, S. 213-214
- AKL, Band 36, 2003, S. 339
- Block, J. C., Jeremias Falck, sein Leben und seine Werke: mit vollständigem alphabetischen und chronologischen Register sämmtlicher Blätter, sowie Reproductionen nach des Künstlers besten Stichen, C. Hinstorff (G. Ehrke)
- Michael Bryan, Dictionary of Painters and Engravers, Biographical and Critical, 1849
