= Mount Karpinskiy =

Mountain in Queen Maud Land, Antarctica

Mount Karpinskiy (72°12′S 18°25′E) is an isolated mountain about 9 nautical miles (17 km) south of Zhelannaya Mountain in the Russkiye Mountains of Queen Maud Land, Antarctica. It was observed and mapped by the Soviet Antarctic Expedition in 1959, and named for geologist A.P. Karpinskiy, President of the Academy of Sciences of the U.S.S.R.
