= Daniel Schultz =

Danzig-born painter (c. 1615–1683)

- Self-portrait ca. 1635, National Museum in Warsaw
- Born: c. 1615; Danzig, Royal Prussia, Polish–Lithuanian Commonwealth
- Died: 1683 (aged 67–68); Danzig, Royal Prussia, Polish–Lithuanian Commonwealth
- Known for: Painting
- Movement: Baroque
- Patrons: John II Casimir Vasa, Michael Korybut Wiśniowiecki, John III Sobieski

(Georg) Daniel Schultz known also as Daniel Schultz the Younger (c. 1615 – 1683) was a prominent painter of the Baroque era, born in Danzig (present-day Gdańsk) and active in the Polish–Lithuanian Commonwealth. He painted many Polish and Lithuanian nobles, members of the royal family, local patricians, such as the astronomer Johannes Hevelius; animals, and hunts. His work can be found at the Wawel Castle State Art Collections, the Warsaw National Museum, the Stockholm National Museum, the Hermitage Museum, and at the Gdańsk National Museum.

== Life and professional career ==
Born somewhere around 1615 in Danzig (now Gdańsk), in Pomeranian Voivodeship, Polish–Lithuanian Commonwealth, Schultz learned the art of painting from his uncle, Daniel Schultz the Elder, another important painter, working in his workshop for about five years. After his uncle's death he travelled to France and the Netherlands to continue his studies for about three years.

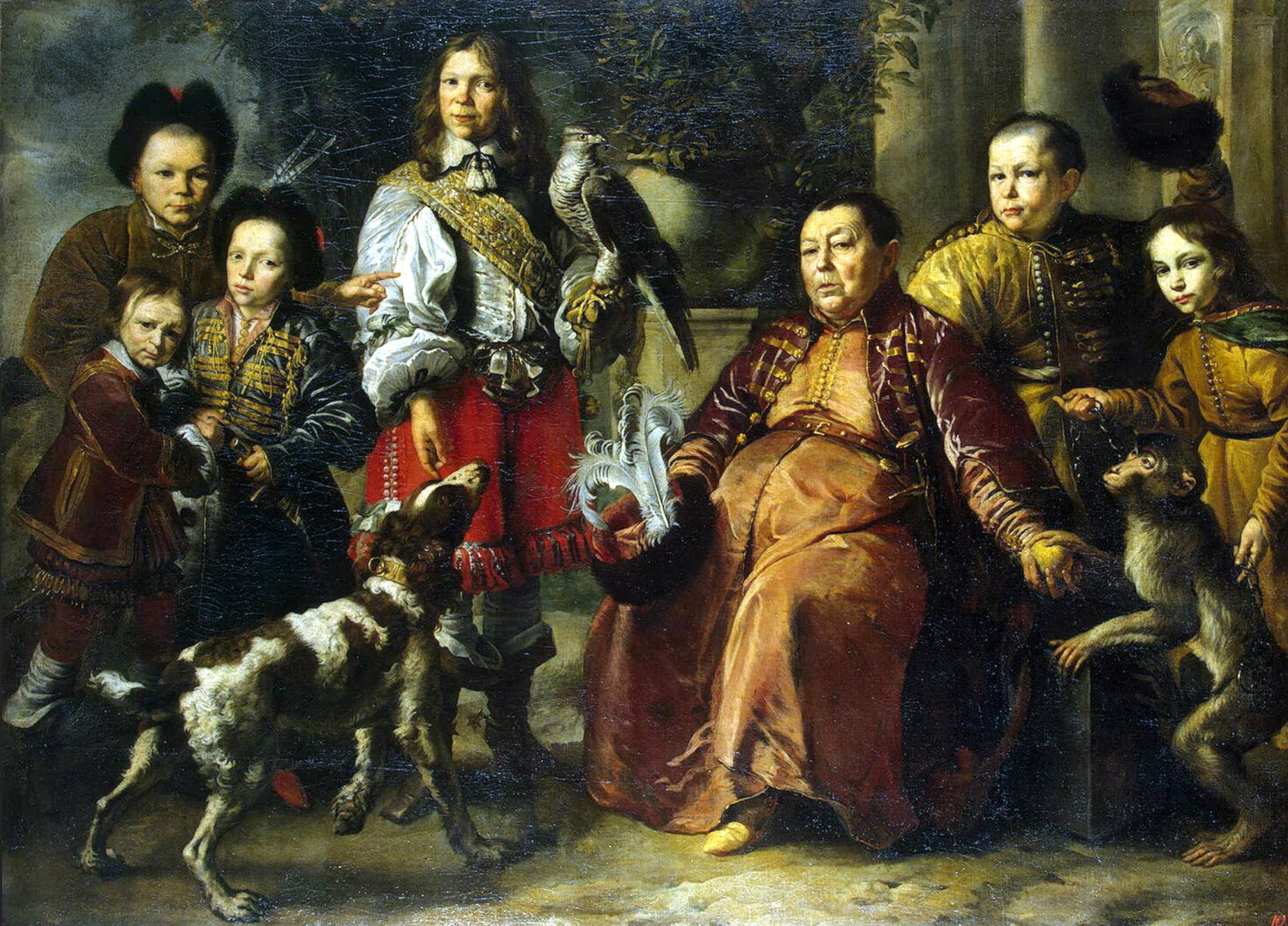
Crimean Falconer of King John Casimir, 1664, Hermitage Museum

Schultz became the leading artist at the Warsaw court of the Polish kings in the second half of the 17th century. In 1649 he became a private painter to the Polish king John II, and then to successor kings Michael Wiśniowiecki and John III. Schultz returned to his hometown around 1660, yet from time to time worked on royal commissions in Warsaw, often in the Wilanów Palace. His great portraits of Polish kings and nobles are among the best examples of Baroque art in Poland. The most notable of his works Crimean Falconer of King John II Casimir with his Family (also known as The Family Portrait, today in the State Hermitage Museum in St. Petersburg) was painted in 1664. It depicts Crimean Agha Dedesh (or Dedis) with his sons and servants. The eldest son of Agha was entitled Royal Falconer in reward for his father's support during the Russo-Polish War (1654–1667). This work was painted during Agha's visit to Warsaw after successful invasion of the Left-bank Ukraine (1663–1664). Rich colour variations of cerise, dark green and orange create an ideal composition with silver-brown tone of the painting. Some of the portraits of John II are also well known - en pied propaganda portrait in Polish costume, when he was leading the Berestechko expedition and so-called Bielany portrait in armour with black glow of burning Kraków in background.

His greatest activity occurred during the reign of John II. At that time Schultz painted many portraits and religious paintings. For the abdicating king he painted Saint Casimir, which was later displayed in the Abbey of Saint-Germain-des-Prés in Paris (missing). After the king's death, he painted his coffin portrait (now at the Royal Castle in Warsaw), that was later placed in the Marble Room at the Royal Castle among preserved 22 effigies of the Polish monarchs by Peter Danckerts de Rij. The inspirations of Rembrandt and Philippe de Champaigne are visible in his works.

During his career at the court he probably had contact with some of Rembrandt's works, as king John II was a passionate collector of Dutch paintings and by his agent in Amsterdam, Gerrit van Uylenburgh, he purchased many of his works (e.g. The bath of Diana, Actaeon).

Schultz lived in Gdańsk at the same time as the engraver Jeremias Falck (c. 1620–1664), who often engraved portraits after Schultz's paintings.

== Selected works ==
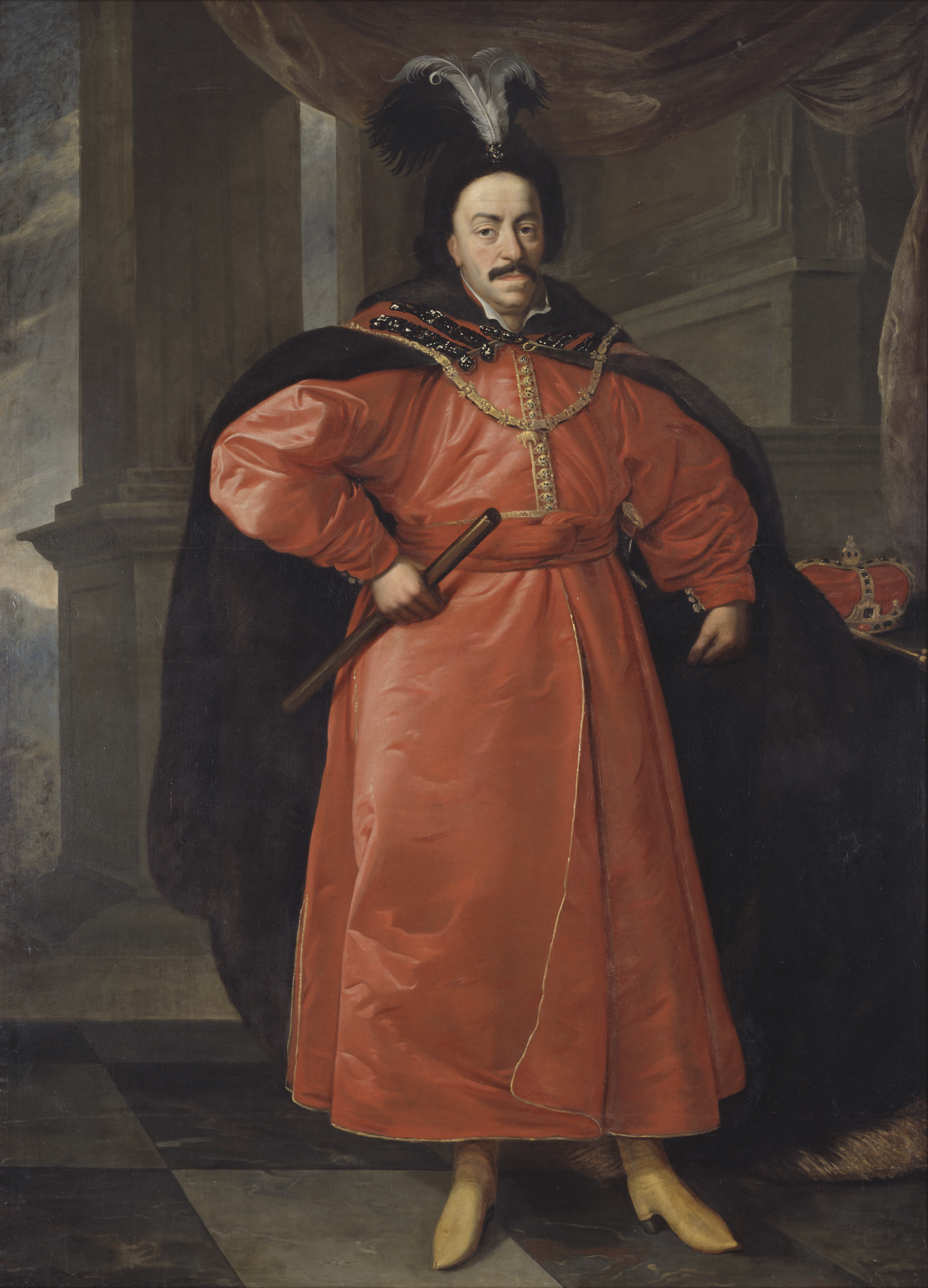
Portrait of King John II Casimir, c. 1649, Nationalmuseum

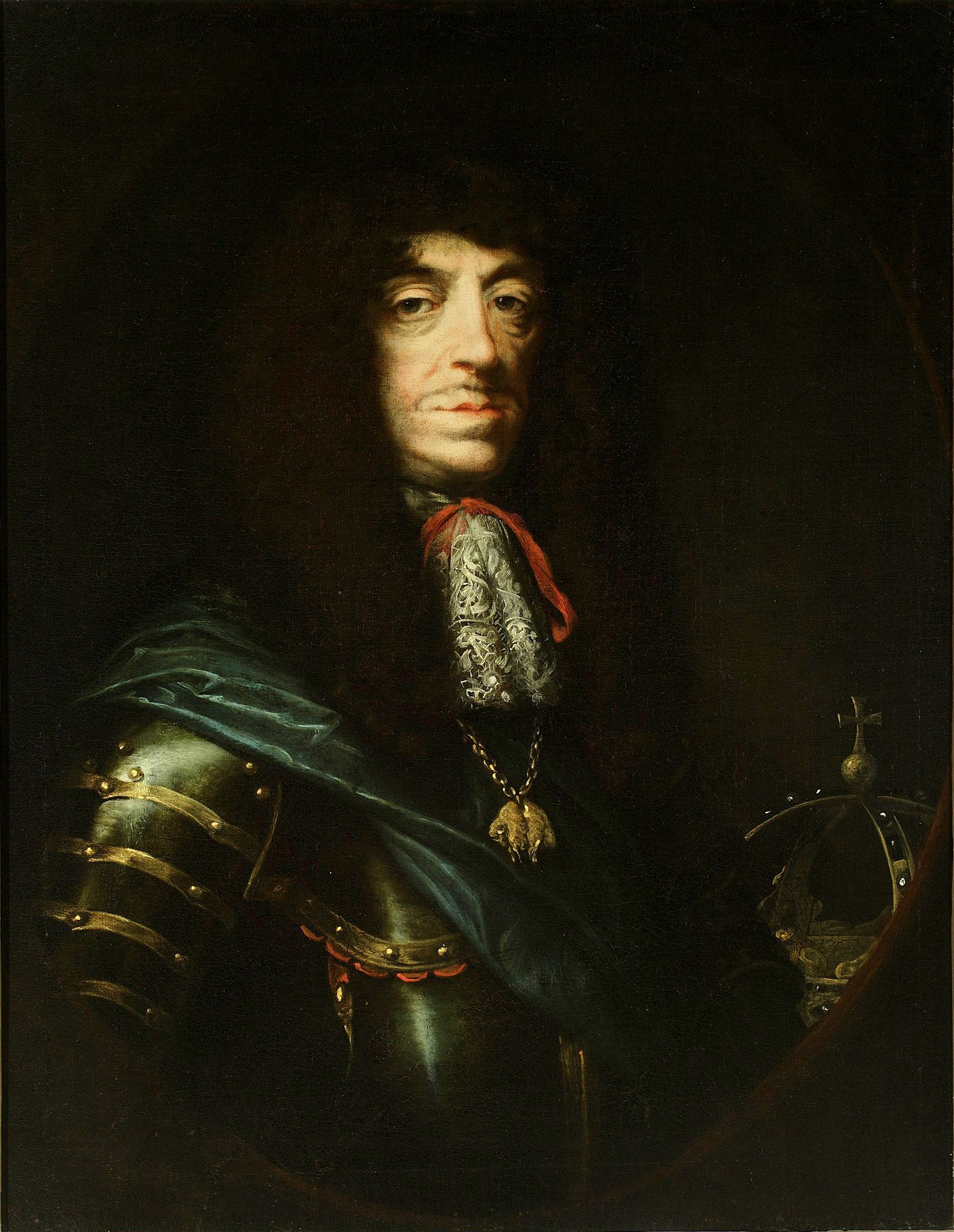
John Casimir, c. 1667, National Museum, Warsaw

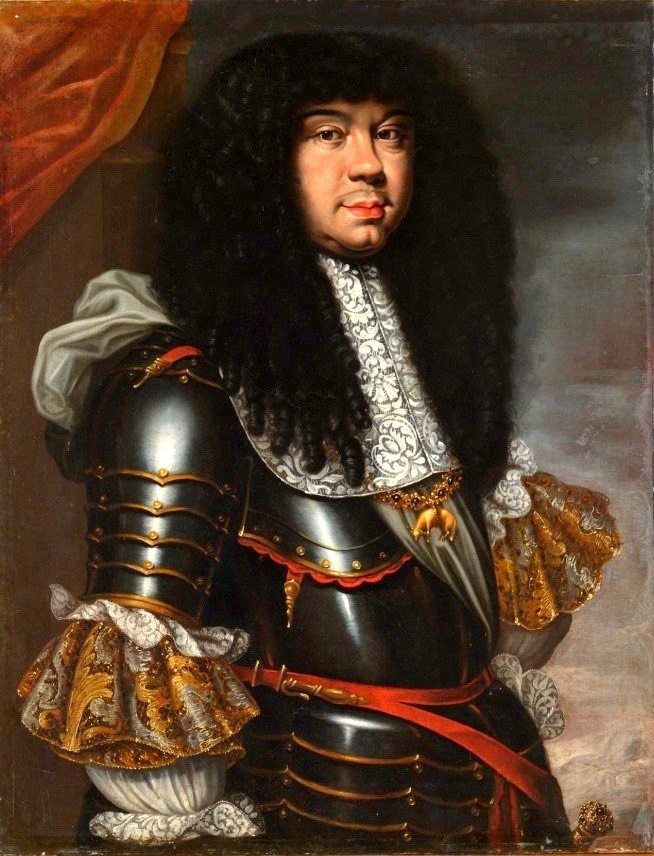
Michael Korybut Wisniowiecki, 1670, Lviv National Art Gallery, Ukraine

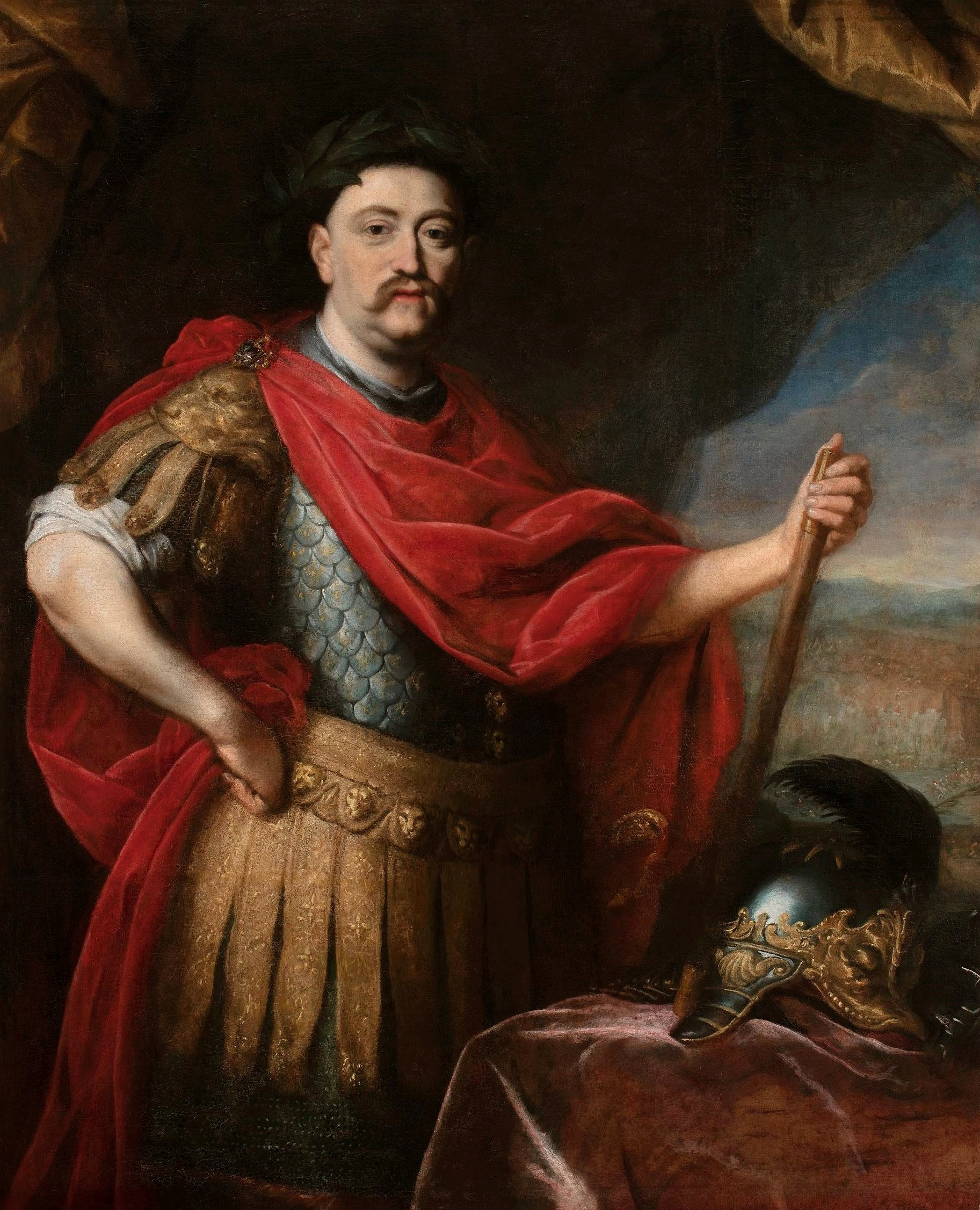
John III Sobieski, 1680, National Museum, Warsaw

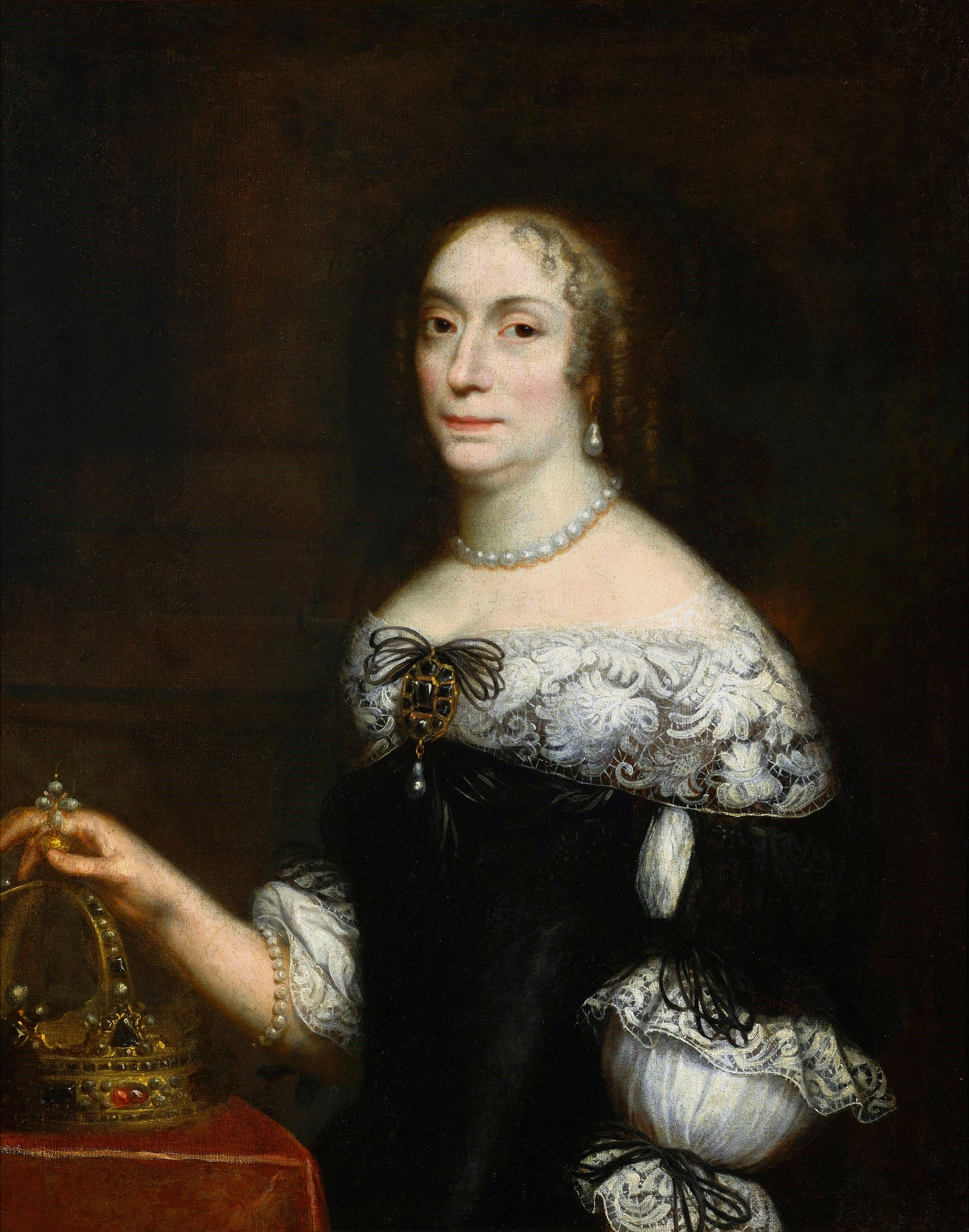
Marie Louise Gonzaga, 1667, National Museum, Warsaw

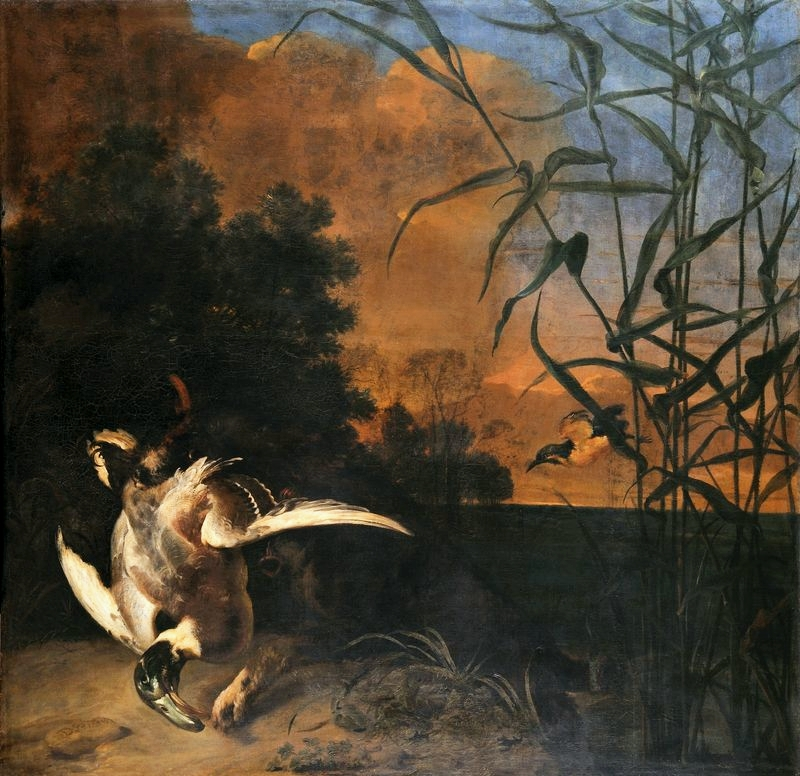
Duck hunt, between 1660-1669, National Museum, Gdańsk

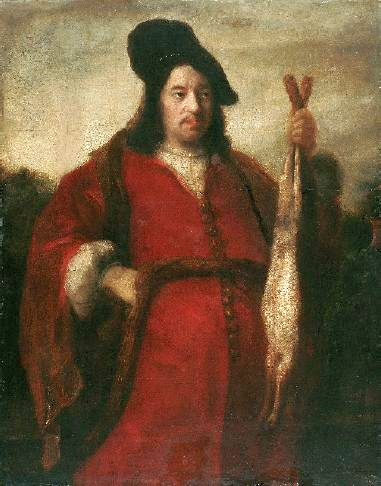
Portrait of a man holding a hare, 1660-1670, National Museum, Wrocław
