= Karpiński (surname) =

Karpiński (Polish feminine: Karpińska; plural: Karpińscy) is a surname. Notable people with the surname include the Karpiński family, a Polish noble family.

== Related surnames ==
| Language | Masculine | Feminine |
|---|---|---|
| Polish | Karpiński | Karpińska |
| Belarusian (Romanization) | Карпінскі (Karpinski) | Карпінская (Karpinskaya, Karpinskaja, Karpinskaia) |
| Czech/Slovak | Karpinský | Karpinská |
| Hungarian | Karpinszki, Karpinszky | |
| Latvian | Karpinskis | Karpinska |
| Lithuanian | Karpinskas | Karpinskienė (married); Karpinskaitė (unmarried) |
| Romanian/Moldovan | Carpinschi, Carpinschii | |
| Russian (Romanization) | Карпинский (Karpinskiy, Karpinskii, Karpinskij, Karpinsky, Karpinski) | Карпинская (Karpinskaya, Karpinskaia, Karpinskaja) |
| Ukrainian (Romanization) | Карпінський (Karpinskyi, Karpinskyy, Karpinskyj, Karpinsky); Карпинський (Karpynskyi, Karpynskyy, Karpynskyj, Karpynsky) | Карпінська (Karpinska); Карпинська (Karpynska) |

== People ==
=== Karpinski, Karpinska ===
- Alfons Karpiński (1875–1961), Polish portrait painter
- Franciszek Karpiński (1741–1826), Polish poet and musical arranger
- Gene Karpinski (born 1952), American activist
- Jacek Karpiński (1927–2010), Polish computer engineer
- Jan Jerzy Karpiński (1896–1965), Polish entomologist, forester, and ecologist
- Janis Karpinski (born 1953), American army officer
- Louis Charles Karpinski (1878–1956), American mathematician and science historian
- Lucjan Karpiński, Polish diplomat
- Ludwika Karpińska (1872–1937), Polish psychologist
- Marek Karpinski (born 1948), Polish computer scientist and mathematician
- Marzena Karpińska (born 1988), Polish weightlifter
- Światopełk Karpiński (1909–1940), Polish poet
- Stefan Karpinski, American computer scientist
- Włodzimierz Witold Karpiński (born 1961), Polish politician
- Zbigniew Karpiński (1906–1983), Polish architect

=== Karpinsky ===
- Alexander Karpinsky (1846–1936), Russian geologist
- Janice Karpinsky, character in 11/11/11
