= Michał Korybut Wiśniowiecki =

Ruler of Poland–Lithuania from 1669 to 1673

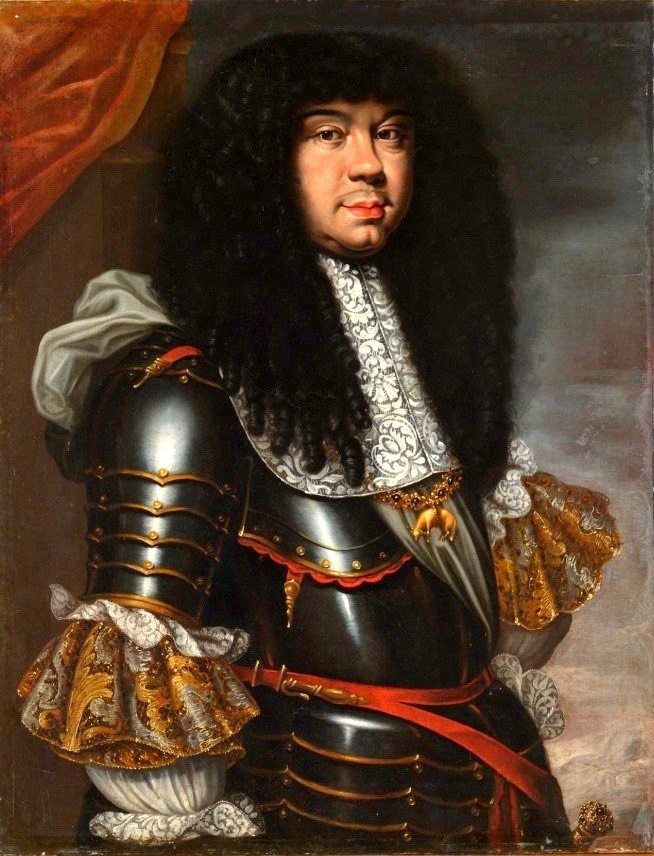
- Portrait by Daniel Schultz, 1670

King of Poland Grand Duke of Lithuania
- Reign: 19 June 1669 – 10 November 1673
- Coronation: 29 September 1669
- Predecessor: John II Casimir Vasa
- Successor: John III Sobieski
- Born: Michał Tomasz Wiśniowiecki; 31 May 1640; Biały Kamień, Polish–Lithuanian Commonwealth
- Died: 10 November 1673 (aged 33); Lwów, Polish–Lithuanian Commonwealth
- Burial: 31 January 1676; Wawel Cathedral, Kraków
- Spouse: Eleonora Maria of Austria (m. 1670)
- Issue: Stillborn son
- House: Wiśniowiecki
- Father: Jeremi Wiśniowiecki
- Mother: Gryzelda Konstancja Zamoyska
- Religion: Roman Catholicism
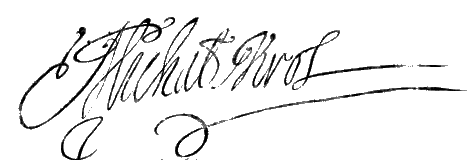
- Signature

Michał Korybut Wiśniowiecki (31 May 1640 – 10 November 1673), also known as Michał Tomasz Wiśniowiecki (Lithuanian: Mykolas Kaributas Višnioveckis), and under a regal name Michael (Polish: Michał; Lithuanian: Mykolas), was the ruler of the Polish–Lithuanian Commonwealth as King of Poland and Grand Duke of Lithuania from 29 September 1669 until his death in 1673.

Michał was chosen partly because of the merit of his father, Prince Jeremi Wiśniowiecki, a powerful border magnate who had helped suppress the rebellious Cossacks during the Khmelnytsky Uprising. After Michał's early death, these setbacks were reversed at the Battle of Khotyn (Chocim) in 1673 by his successor, John III Sobieski, who defeated an Austrian candidate in the election.

In 1670, Michał was married to Eleonora Maria of Austria (1653–1697), daughter of Ferdinand III, Holy Roman Emperor, and his third wife Eleonora Gonzaga. They had one son, who died at birth.

== Biography ==
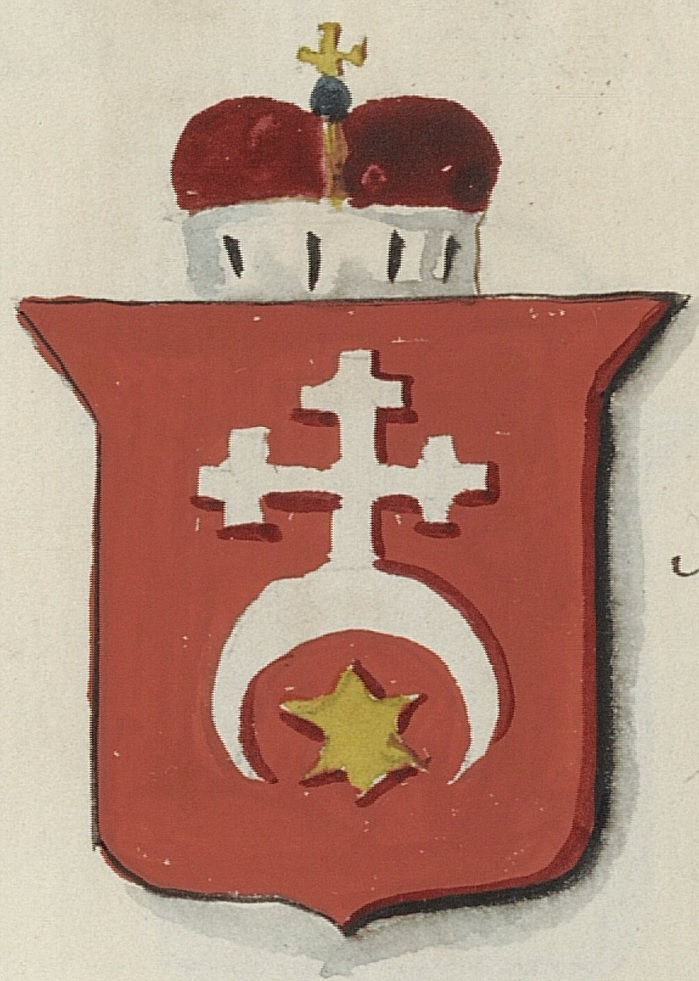
Personal coat of arms

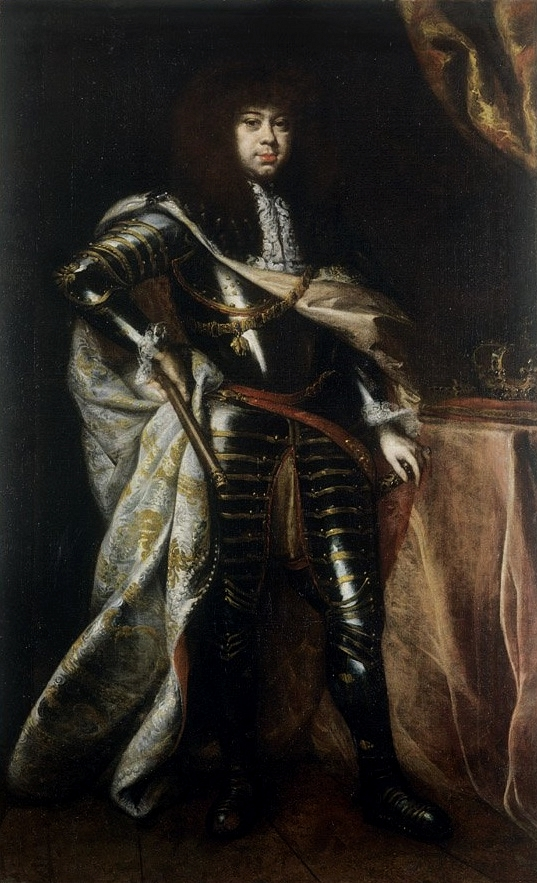
Painting by Daniel Schultz

Michał was the son of Jeremi Wiśniowiecki and his wife Gryzelda Konstancja Zamoyska. His parents likely met each other in September 1637 in Warsaw during the crowning of Cecilia Renata of Austria, the Queen of Poland and consort to Władysław IV Vasa. They were engaged on 13 February 1638, over a month after the death of Gryzelda's father, Tomasz Zamoyski.

The wedding took place in Zamość on 27 February 1639, and over a year later, on 31 May 1640, Michael Korybut was most likely born in the village of Bilyi Kamin as Michał Tomasz Wiśniowiecki. The infant was then taken to Zamość, where he spent the first two years of his life under the care of his grandmother Katarzyna Ostrogska (née Ostrogska). In 1642, Michał was taken by his mother to Lubny. During the Khmelnytsky Uprising, he fled Left-bank Ukraine with his family and first settled in Wiśniowiec in Volhynia, before arriving in Zamość in autumn 1648.

Jeremi Wiśniowiecki died in 1651, when most of his enormous estate remained under Cossack control. From 1651–1655, young Michał was under the care of Karol Ferdynand Vasa, the bishop of Wrocław and Płock. The boy stayed at the residence of the Bishops of Płock, in the town of Brok. After the death of Bishop Vasa on 9 May 1655, he was taken in by his wealthy uncle, Jan Zamoyski, Voivode of Sandomierz, who funded his education. Sometime in mid-1655, Michał found himself at the court of King John II Casimir.

Following the Swedish invasion of Poland, Michał, together with the royal court, fled to Głogówek in Upper Silesia. On 18 November 1655, following the request of the king, he went to Nysa, to study at the Jesuit College Carolinum and stayed there until March 1656.

In mid-1656, thanks to the support of Queen Marie Louise Gonzaga, Michał Korybut began studying at Charles University in Prague. He returned to Poland in June 1660, but soon afterwards, he headed to Dresden and Vienna to meet Empress Eleonora Gonzaga. There he saw his future wife Eleanor of Austria, who was a child at that time, for the first time. On this trip, Michał improved his knowledge of languages; he spoke Latin, German, Italian, French and also likely Tatar and Turkish as well.

In 1663, Michał took part in the Russo-Polish War, and during the Lubomirski Rebellion, he loyally supported the king.

=== Election ===
The Polish-Lithuanian Commonwealth from 1667 to 1672 (including the first few years of his reign)

On 16 September 1668, John II Casimir Vasa abdicated the Polish throne and left the country to live in France, making a new election necessary. The Bishop of Chełmno, Andrzej Olszowski, suggested that Michał Korybut should be listed as one of the candidates for the throne. Wiśniowiecki was supported by the Polish nobility, who sensed that a poor and inexperienced prince would not pose a threat to their rights enshrined in the Golden Liberty.

The Free election of 1669 took place in May and June of that year. Michał Korybut Wiśniowiecki was elected King of Poland and Grand Duke of Lithuania on 19 June and became known as Michał. Most of the gathered nobility voted for him as they wished to choose a native, Polish candidate (the so-called "Piast"), over foreign candidates. Wiśniowiecki won 11,271 votes and was crowned on 29 September 1669 in Kraków.

His election was immediately opposed by the pro-French camp, led by Primate of Poland Mikołaj Prażmowski and Crown Hetman John Sobieski.

On 27 February 1670, Michał married Austrian princess Eleanor, and the ceremony was celebrated by Papal Nuncio, Cardinal Galeazzo Marescotti, as Primate Prażmowski refused to attend. The reception took place at the Denhoff Palace in Kruszyna.

=== Internal conflicts ===
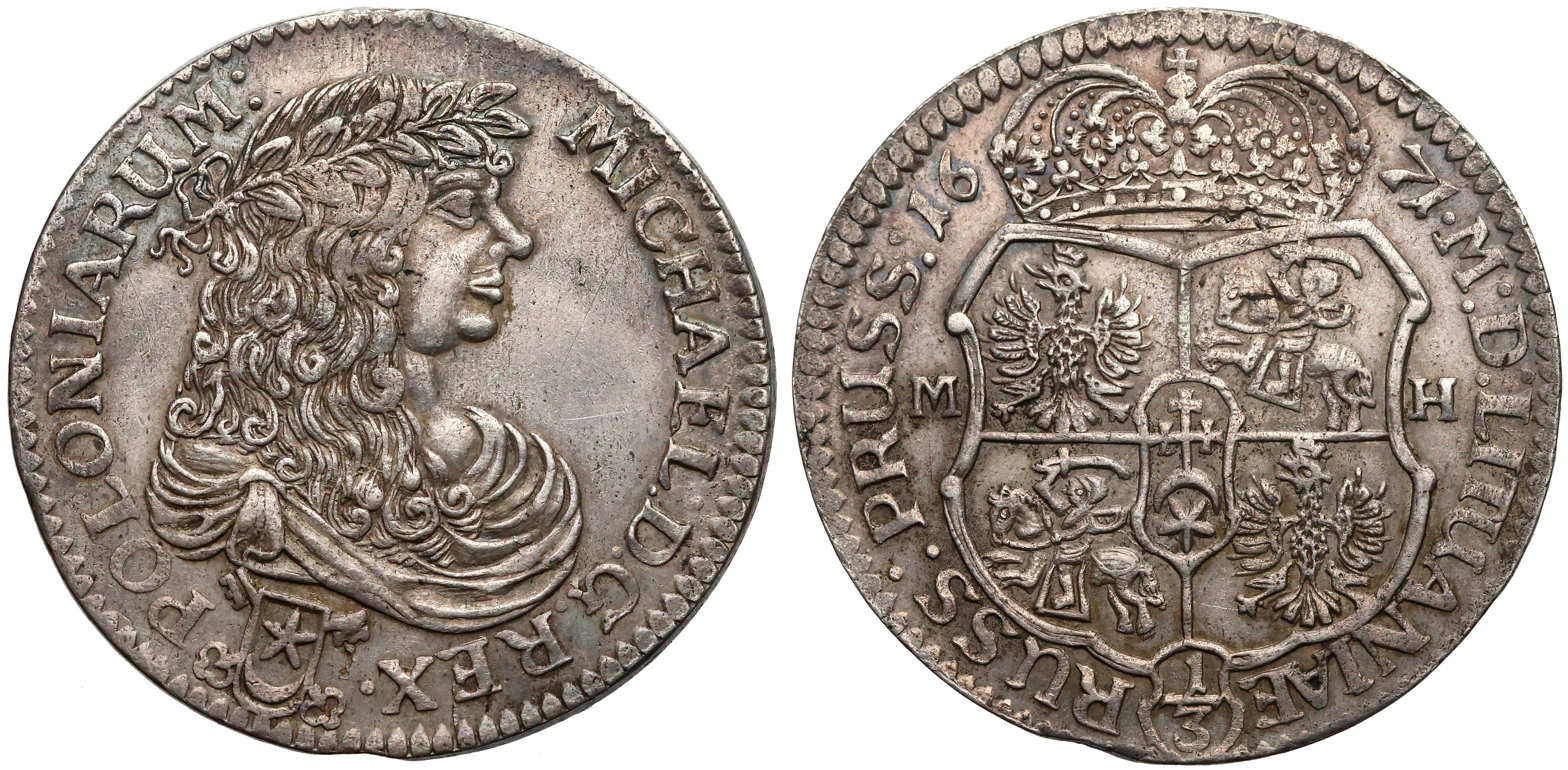
Polish coin minted during Michał's reign, c. 1671

Poland-Lithuania between 1672 and 1676

Following the 1669 election, the Commonwealth was divided between two camps – pro-French and royal. The pro-French camp had several influential members, including Primate Prazmowski, Hetman Sobieski, Andrzej Morsztyn, Voivode of Kraków Aleksander Michał Lubomirski, Voivode of Ruthenia Stanisław Jan Jabłonowski, Voivode of Poznań Krzysztof Grzymultowski, and Bishop of Kraków Andrzej Trzebicki.

In November 1669, the French camp broke the Coronation Sejm, hoping to dethrone Michał and elect Count Charles-Paris d'Orléans-Longueville. In 1670, the internal struggle moved to the local sejmiks, during which the nobility demanded to bring a Sejm lawsuit against Hetman Sobieski. To defend their commander, Sobieski's soldiers formed a Confederation near Trembowla.

To make matters worse, the divided Commonwealth was under constant Turkish threat. In 1671, the king supported a rebellion of a unit of Stanisław Wyżycki, who, against the explicit order of Sobieski, abandoned Volhynia, leaving the province defenceless. King Michał ordered Wyżycki and his men to spend the winter of 1671/1672 in the wealthy starostwo of Sambor, and paid them their salaries, while Sobieski and his soldiers did not receive any money.

In 1672, the Ottoman Empire declared war on the Commonwealth, and the Polish–Ottoman War of 1672–1676 began. Despite this, the situation in the Polish Crown was still chaotic, with the danger of a civil war. The nobility formed a confederation near Gołąb, demanding the removal of Primate Prażmowski. Its members looted real estate owned by Hetman Sobieski and his family. On 22 November 1672 Lithuanian soldiers formed their own confederation in Kobryń, declaring their support for the Gołąb confederation. In response, soldiers under Sobieski formed a confederation in Szczebrzeszyn. John Sobieski, together with his troops, headed to Łowicz, to meet Primate Prażmowski.

Negotiations between the two factions were carried out by Papal Nuncio Francesco Buonvisi and Bishop of Kraków Andrzej Trzebicki. Furthermore, Sultan Mehmed IV of the Ottoman Empire sent an offensive letter to Warsaw, demanding complete subordination of the Commonwealth. This greatly enraged the Poles but due to chaotic internal situation of the Commonwealth, both sides of the conflict reached an agreement in March 1672.

=== War with the Ottoman Empire ===
In June 1672, a 100,000-strong Ottoman army, under Mehmed IV, besieged the city of Kamieniec Podolski, which capitulated after 26 days. The invaders then approached Lwów, which paid a ransom. Mounted Crimean units penetrated as far as Hrubieszów, Jasło and Biecz.

In October 1672, Hetman John Sobieski, upon request of the senators, tried to stop the invaders, defeating them in the Battle of Niemirów, the Battle of Komarno and the Battle of Petranka. Meanwhile, the Treaty of Buchach was signed on 18 October 1672, in which the king ceded Podolia to the Ottomans and agreed to pay a yearly tribute. Under these terms, the once mighty Polish-Lithuanian Commonwealth was humbled by the Turks.

Soon afterwards, Michał began preparation for a new military campaign against the Ottomans. On 8 October 1673 at Skwarzawa near Złoczów, some 40,000 Polish soldiers concentrated, with 50 cannons. Due to poor health, the king handed the command of the army to Sobieski, and the Poles marched southwards to Khotyn (Chocim).

=== Death, funeral, and legacy ===
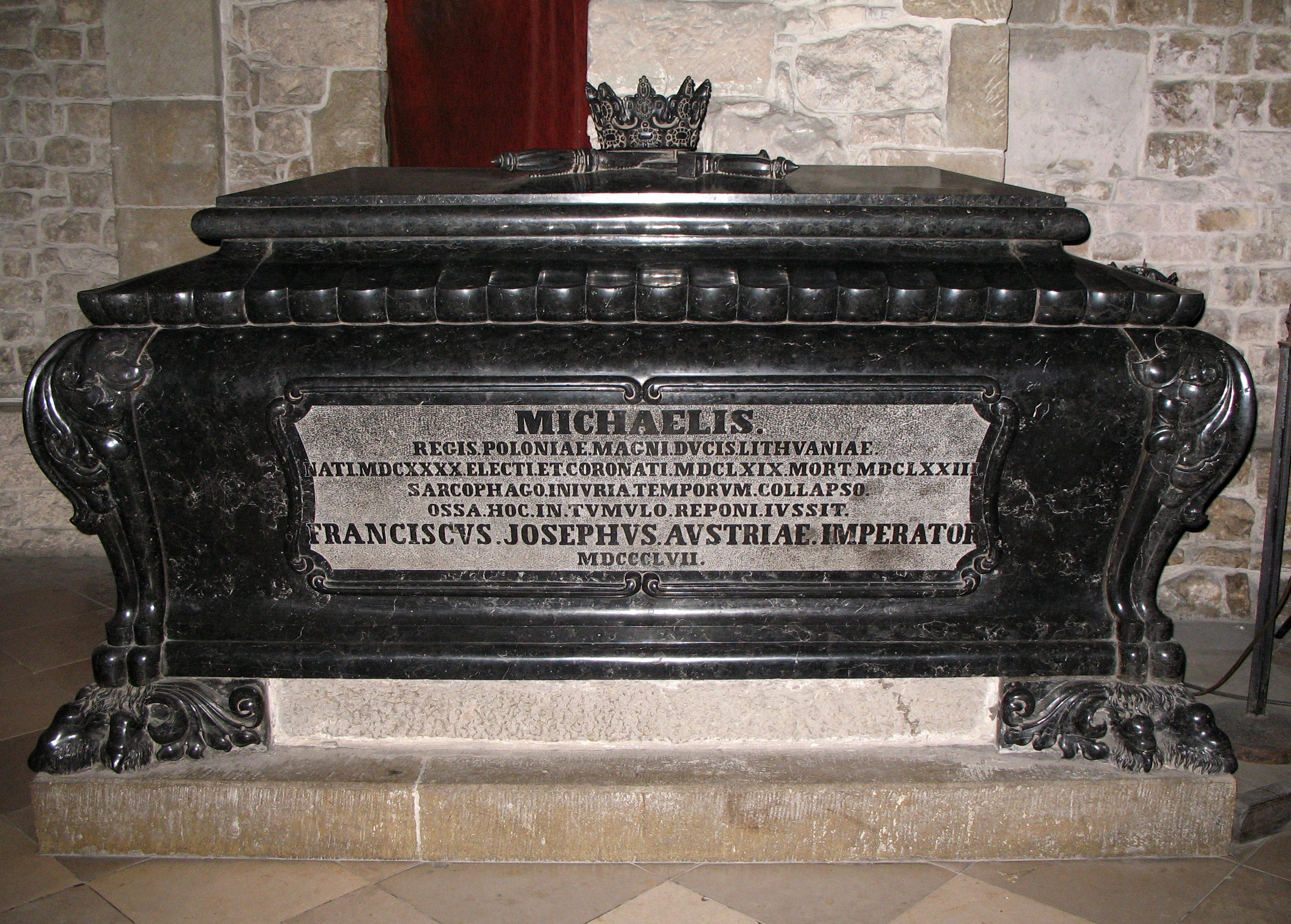
Tomb of King Michael inside Wawel Cathedral

King Michał Korybut died in the Palace of the Archbishops of Lwów, on 10 November 1673. His early demise seems to have been brought about by a severe case of food poisoning, although rumours persisted that he had been murdered by traitorous generals angered at the declining power of the Commonwealth.

The day after his death, John Sobieski won the Battle of Khotyn (Chocim), which reversed some of the losses under Michał's reign. On 19 May 1674 Hetman John Sobieski was elected the new monarch after the Free election of 1674.

After the funeral, the heart of the king was buried at a Camedule Monastery in the Bielany district of Warsaw. The bowels were placed in a wall of the Latin Cathedral in Lwów, while the body was buried in Wawel Cathedral in Kraków on 31 January 1676, the same day that John Sobieski was crowned as John III.

Michał's reign was considered to be less than successful as his ability to be a capable monarch were greatly hurt by Poland's quarrelling factions. His father's military fame notwithstanding, Michael lost the first phase of the Polish–Ottoman War of 1672–1676.

== Ancestry ==
Ancestors of Michał Korybut Wiśniowiecki

8. Michał Wiśniowiecki (1529–1584)
4. Michał Wiśniowiecki
9. Elizabeth Zenowiczówna
2. Jeremi Wiśniowiecki
10. Ieremia Movilă
5. Regina Wiśniowiecka
11. Elisabeta Movilă
1. Michał Korybut Wiśniowiecki
12. Jan Zamoyski
6. Tomasz Zamoyski
13. Barbara Tarnowska
3. Gryzelda Konstancja Wiśniowiecka
14. Oleksander Ostrogski
7. Katarzyna Ostrogska (1602–1642)
15. Anna Kostka

== Gallery ==
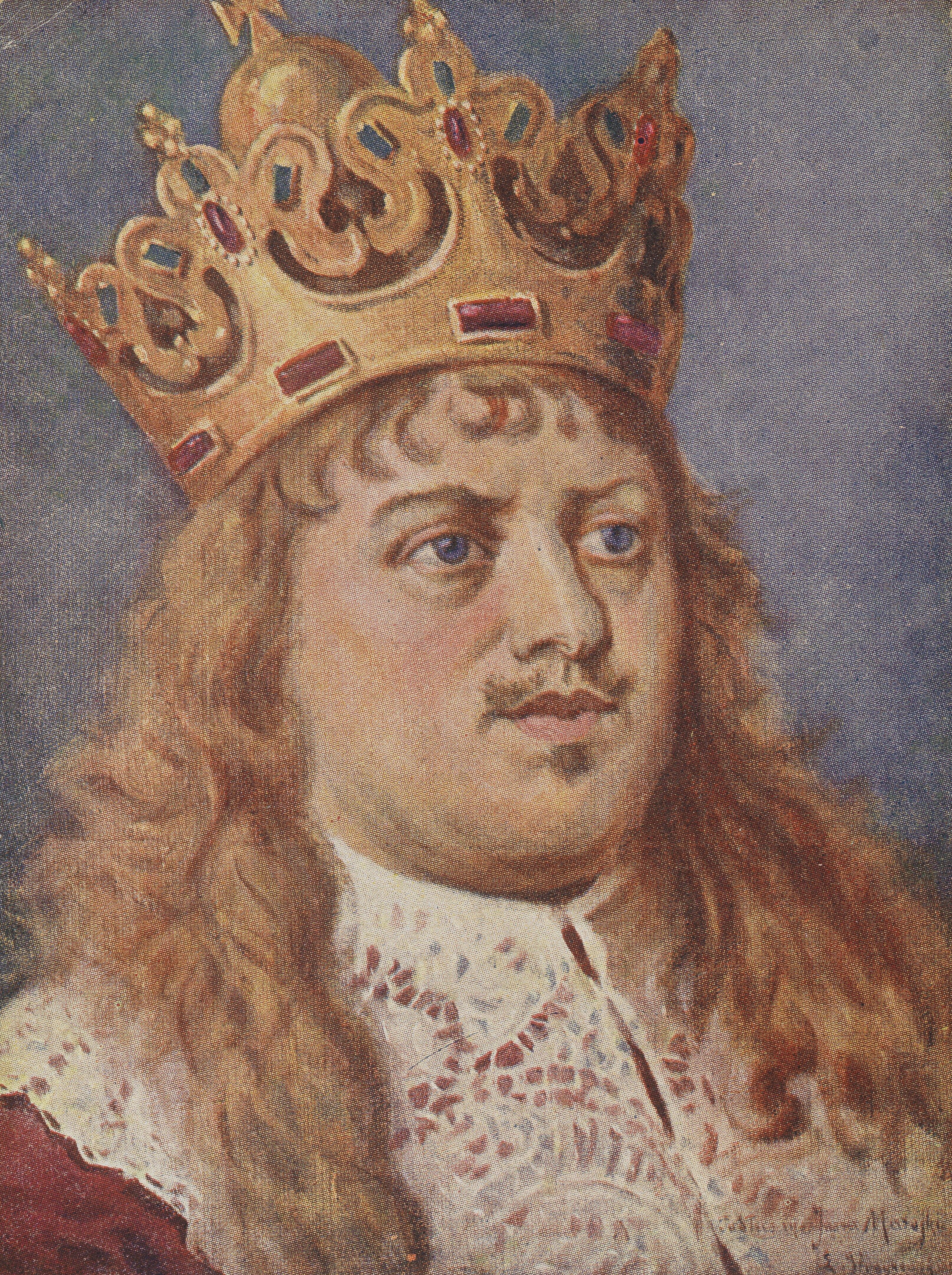
King Michał Korybut Wiśniowiecki by Jan Matejko

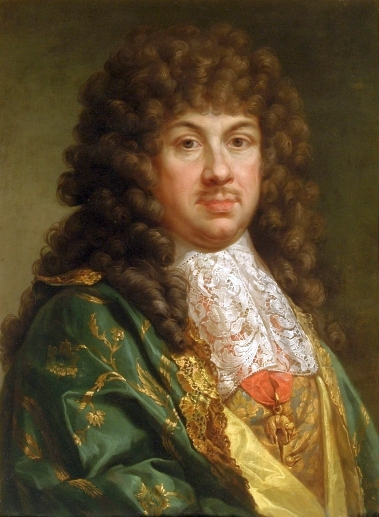
Portrait by Bacciarelli

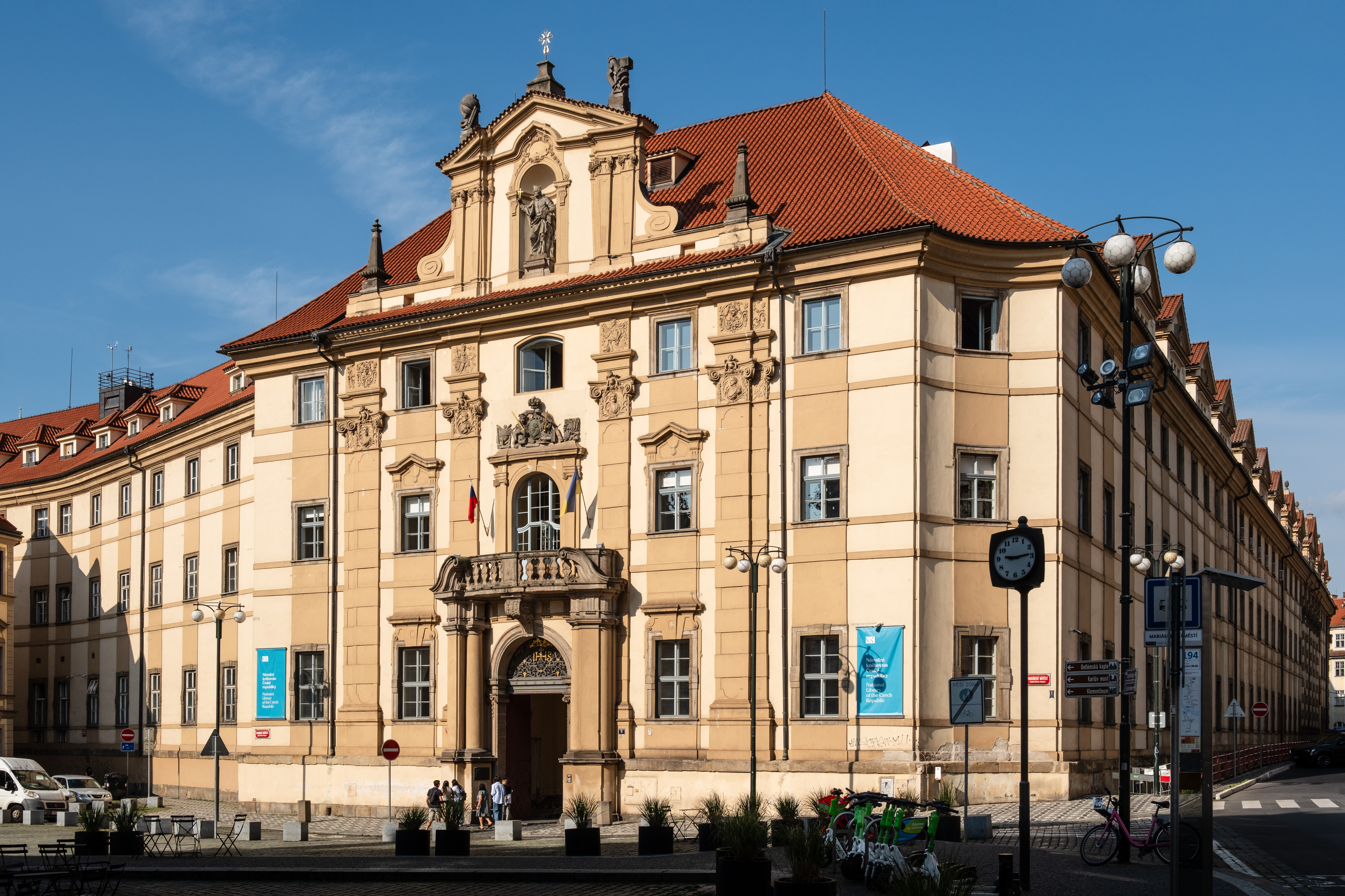
Clementinum in Prague, where he studied

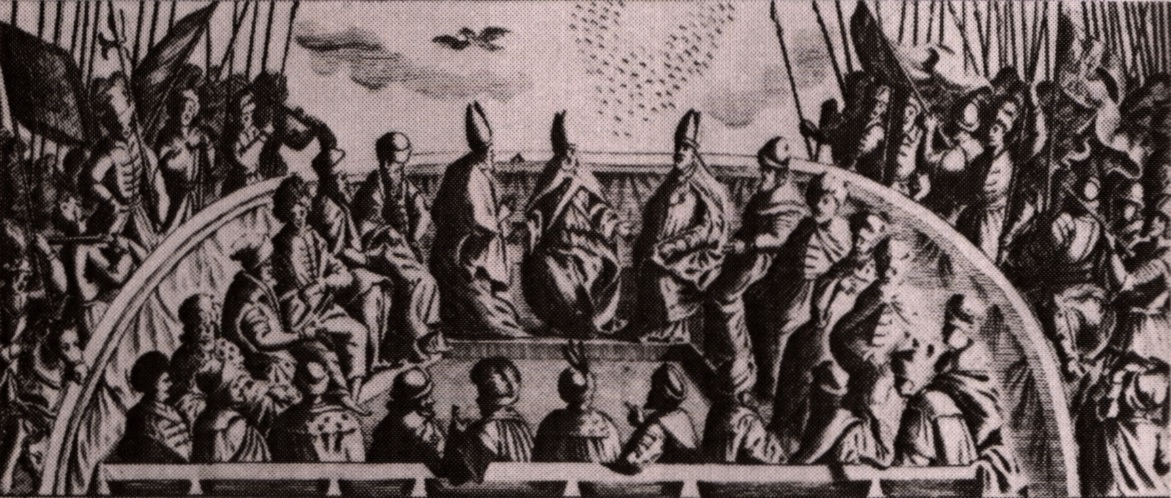
Election of Michał Korybut Wiśniowiecki at Wola

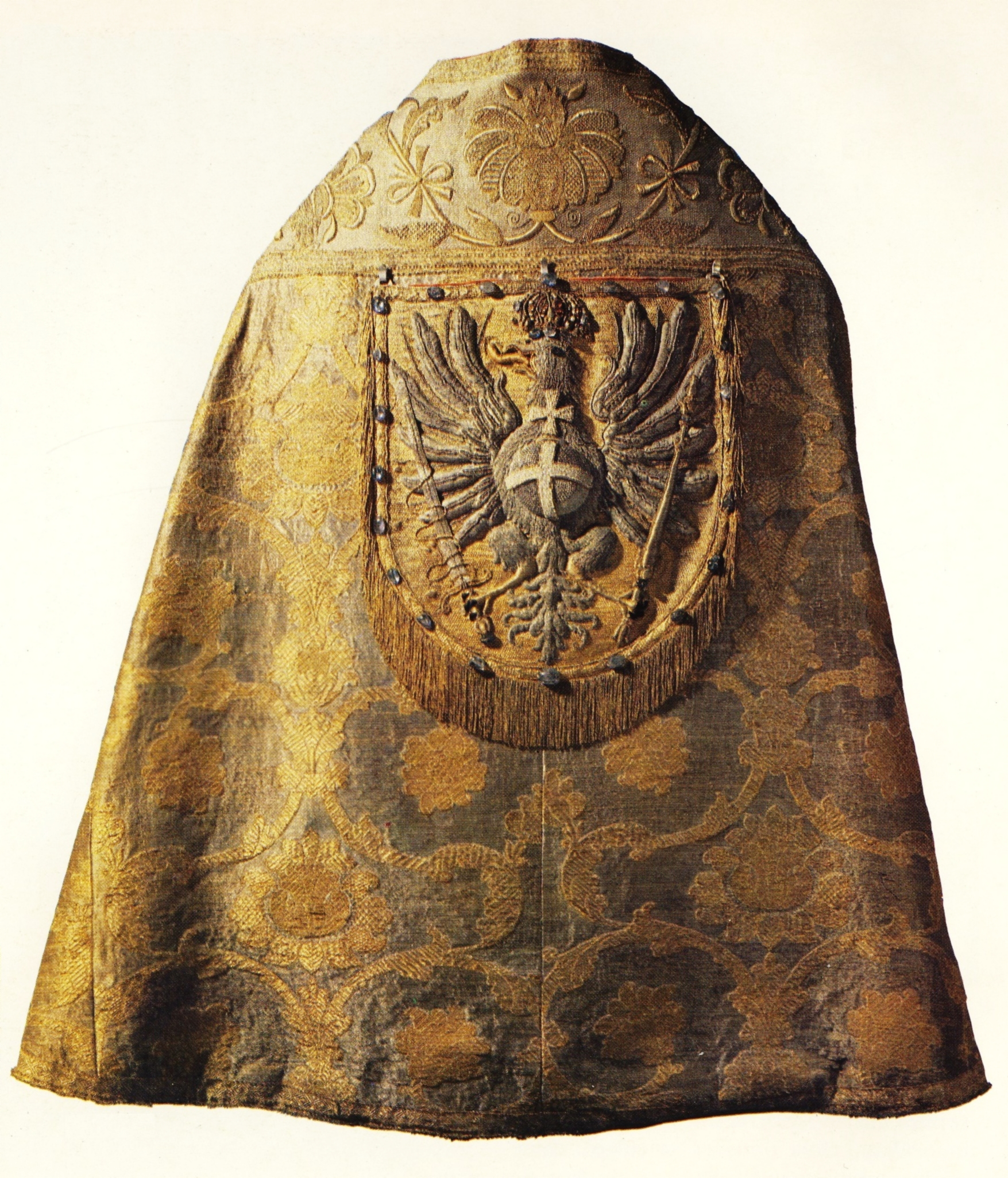
Coronation mantle of Michał Korybut Wiśniowiecki

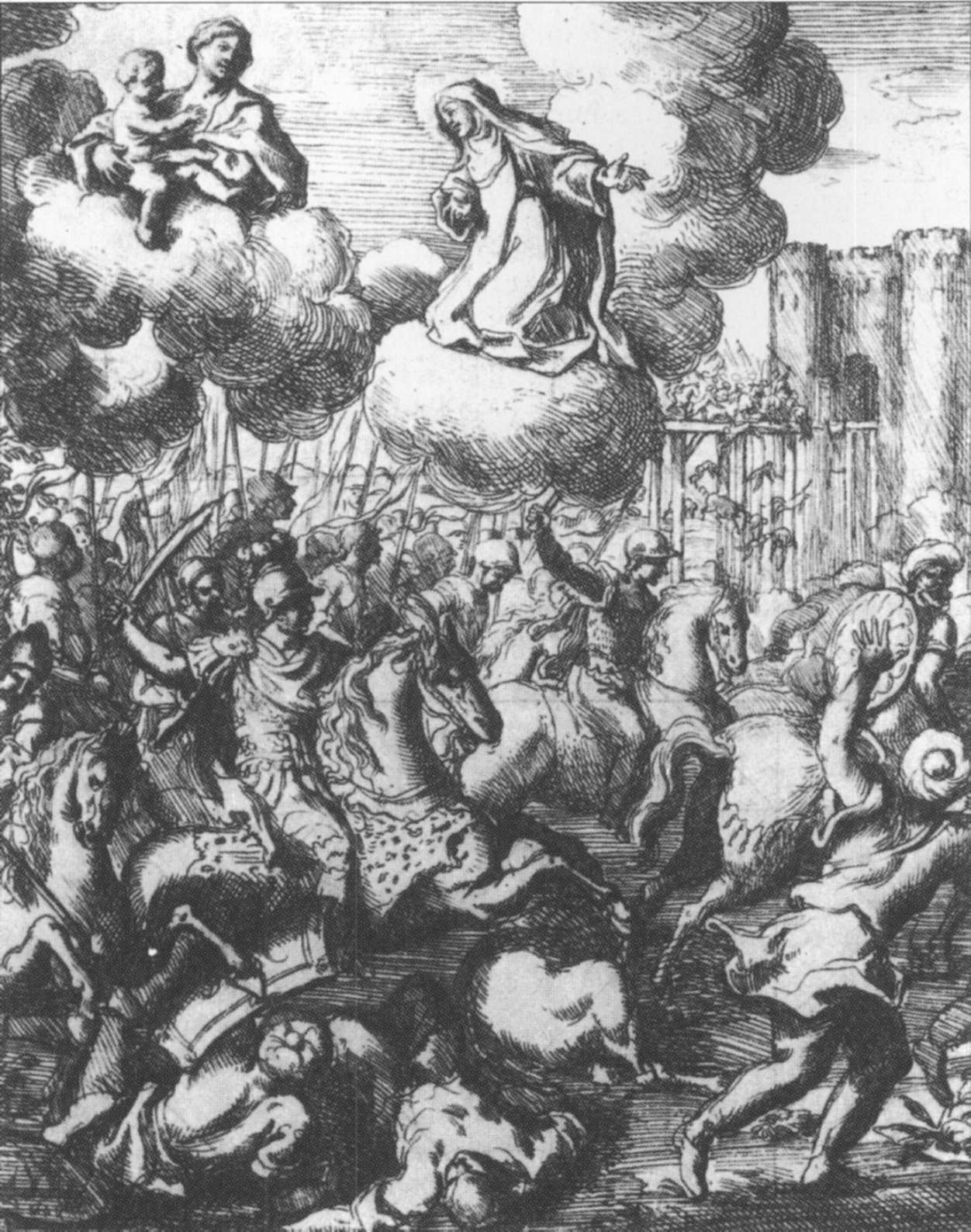
Battle of Khotyn (Chocim) on 11 November 1673

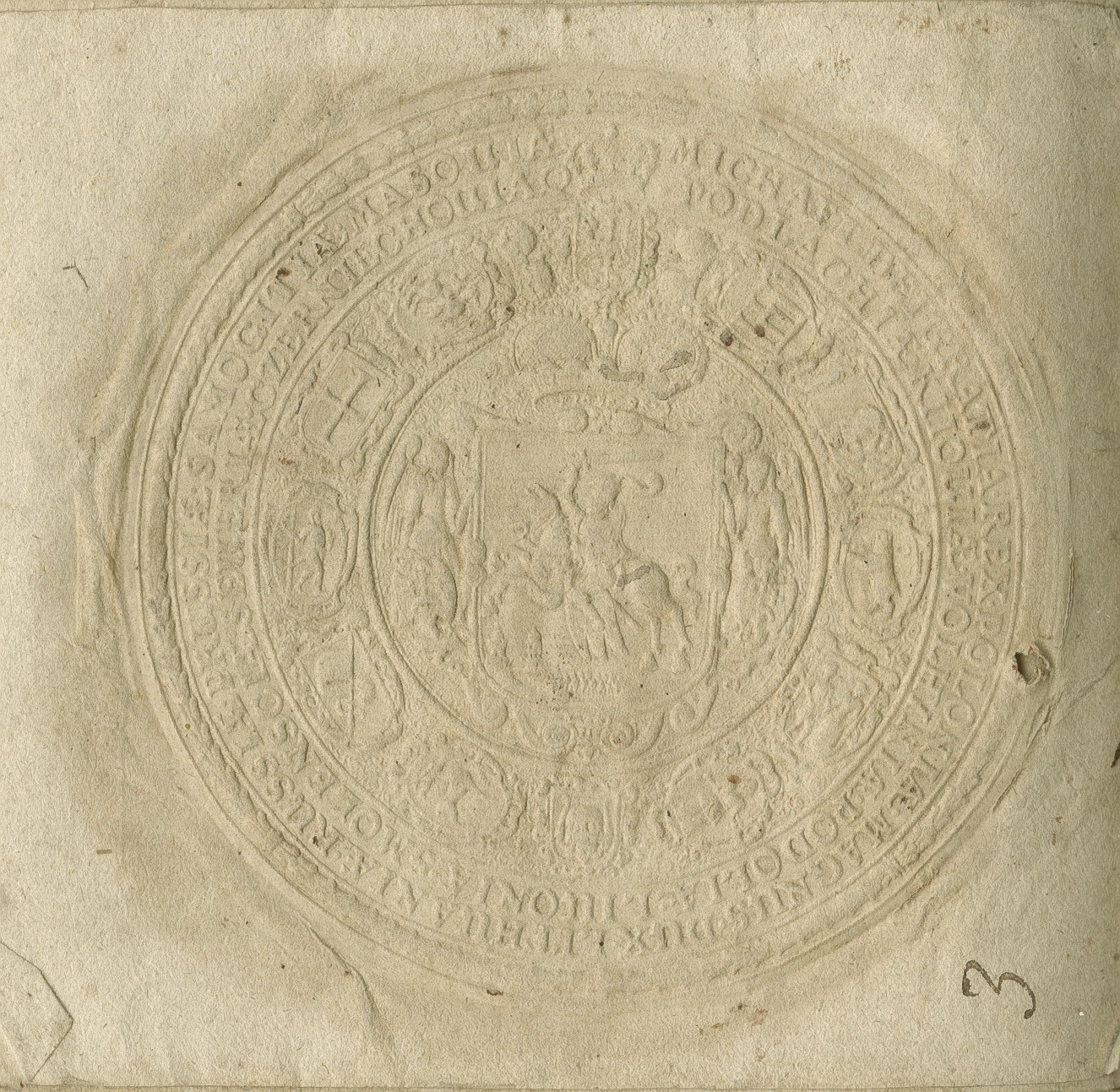
Seal of Grand Duchy of Lithuania (1671), used during Michał Korybut Wiśniowiecki's reign

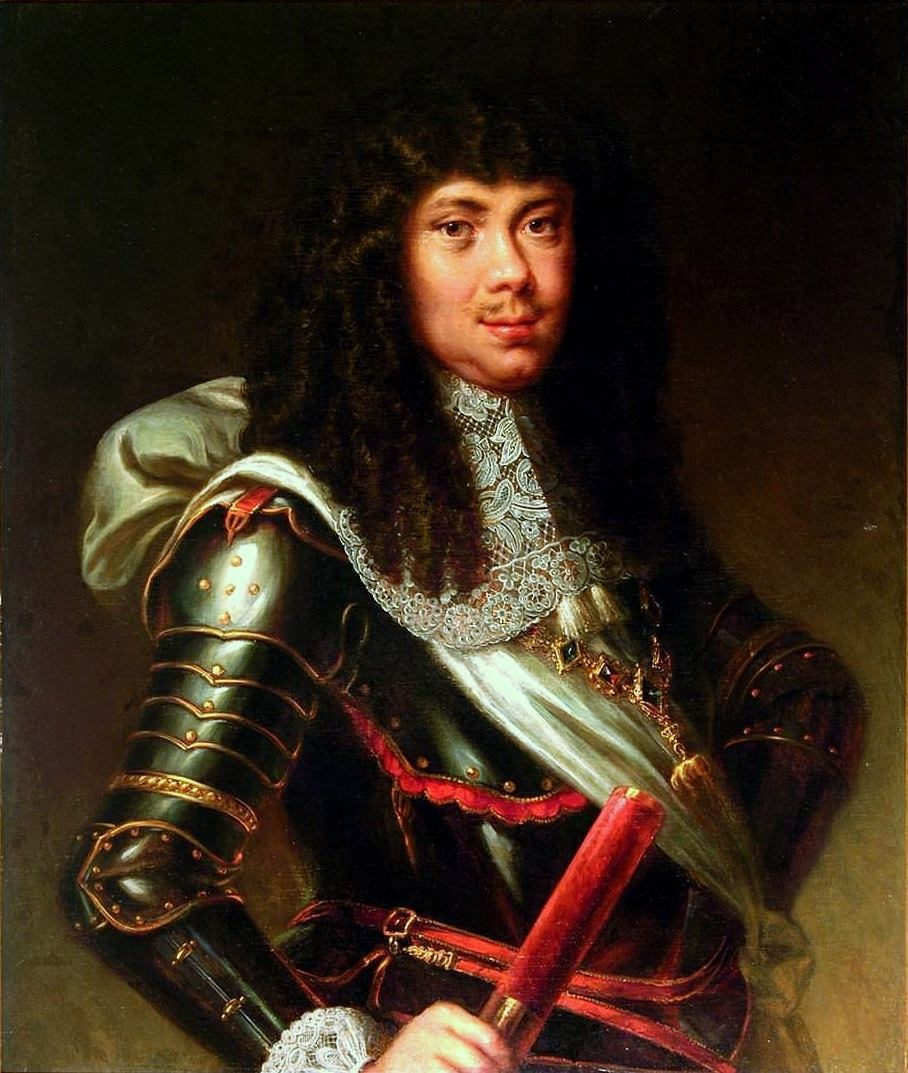
Anonymous portrait of Michał Korybut Wiśniowiecki, 18th century

== Royal titles ==
Coat of Arms

- Official Latin version: Michał, Dei Gratia rex Poloniae, magnus dux Lithuaniae, Russiae, Prussiae, Masoviae, Samogitiae, Livoniae, Smolensciae, Kijoviae, Volhyniae, Podoliae, Podlachiae, Severiae, Czernichoviaeque, etc.

(citation from one contemporary document: "Michael primvs, Dei gratia rex Poloniae, magnus dvx Lituaniae, Russiae, Prussiae, Masouiae, Samogitiae, Kiiouiae, Volhyniae, Podlachiae, Podoliae, Liuoniae, Smolensciae, Seueriae Czernihouiaeque, etc")

- English translation: Michał, by the Grace of God, King of Poland, Grand Duke of Lithuania, Ruthenia, Prussia, Masovia, Samogitia, Livonia, Smolensk, Kiev, Volhynia, Podolia, Podlaskie, Severia and Chernihiv, etc.

== In popular culture ==
Wiśniowiecki appears as a minor supporting character in the second and third season of the Netflix comedy series 1670, where he is portrayed by Mikolaj Chrobozek.

== See also ==
- History of Poland (1569–1795)
- Wiśniowiecki family

Michał Korybut Wiśniowiecki House of Wiśniowiecki Born: 31 May 1640 Died: 10 November 1673
Regnal titles
Vacant Title last held by John II Casimir Vasa	King of Poland; Grand Duke of Lithuania; 1669 – 1673	Vacant Title next held by John III Sobieski
