= Karpin (disambiguation) =

Karpin may refer to:

== Surname ==
- Andra Karpin (born 1979), an Estonian footballer
- Michael Karpin (born 1945), an Israeli broadcast journalist and author
- Valery Karpin, a Russian footballer.

== Place ==
- Karpin, Łódź Voivodeship (central Poland)
- Karpin, Masovian Voivodeship (east-central Poland)
- Karpin, Choszczno County in West Pomeranian Voivodeship (north-west Poland)
- Karpin, Police County in West Pomeranian Voivodeship (north-west Poland)

== See also ==
- Karpov
