= 1674 Polish–Lithuanian royal election =

Royal election in the Polish–Lithuanian Commonwealth

1674 Polish–Lithuanian Free election
- June 19, 1674 – June 21, 1674
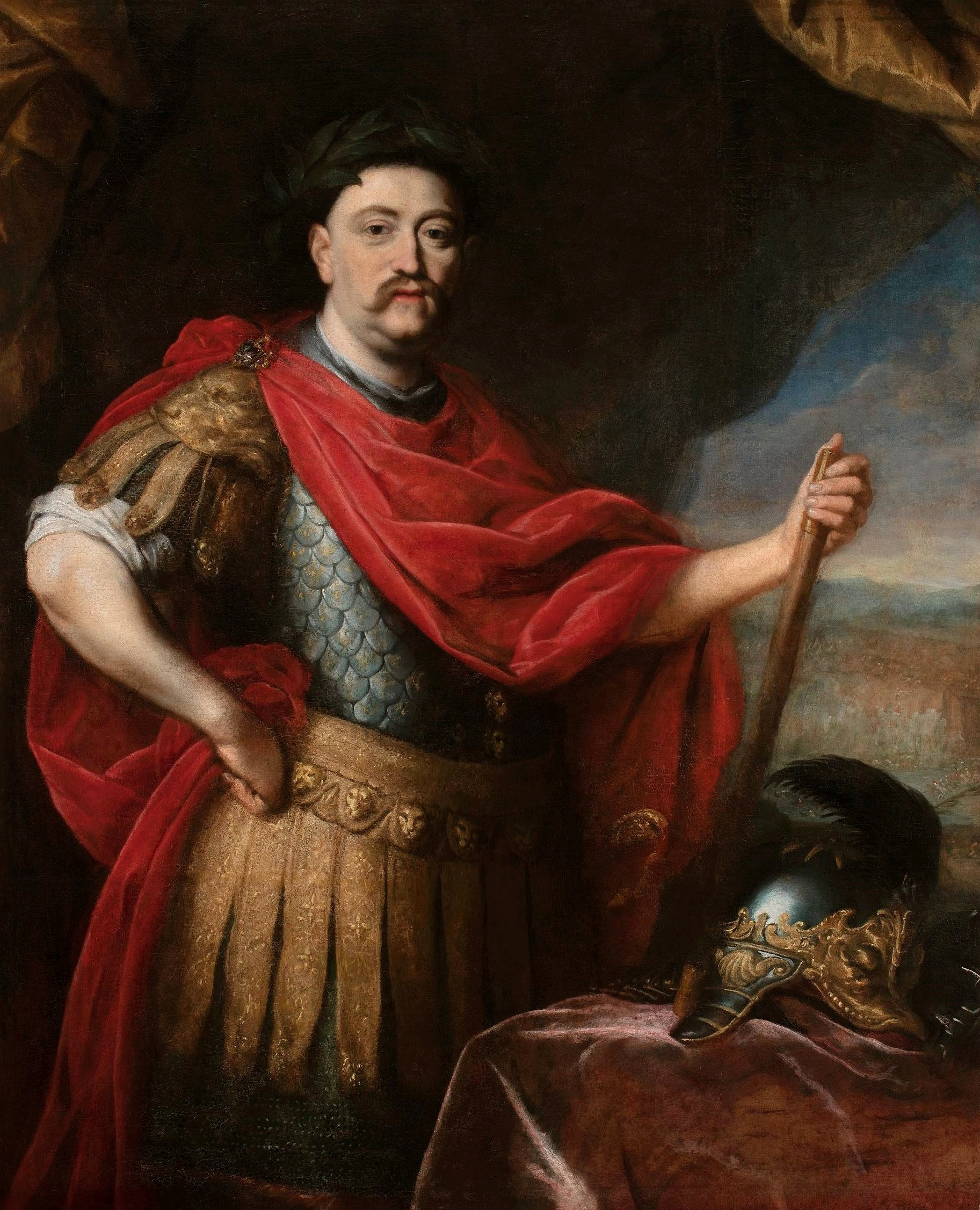

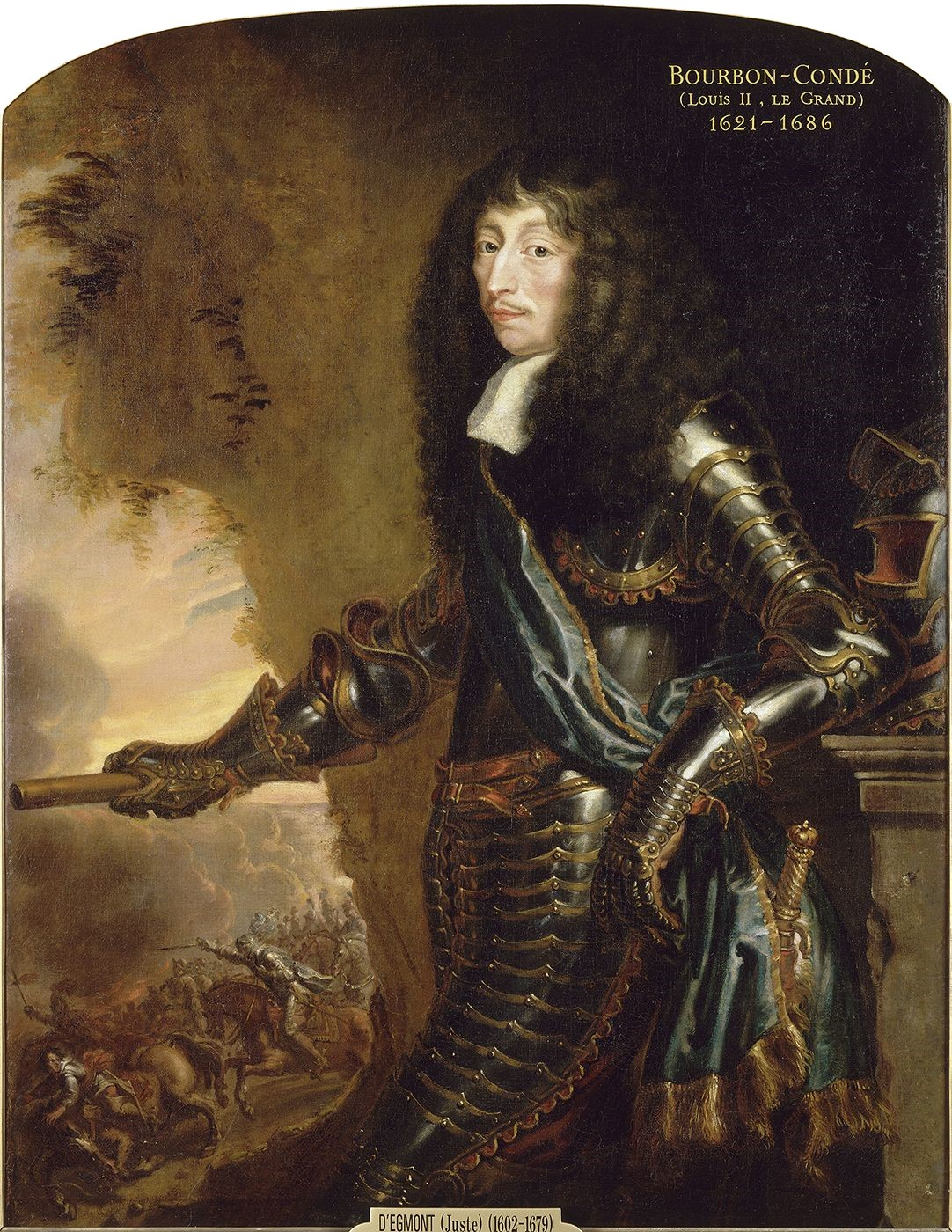

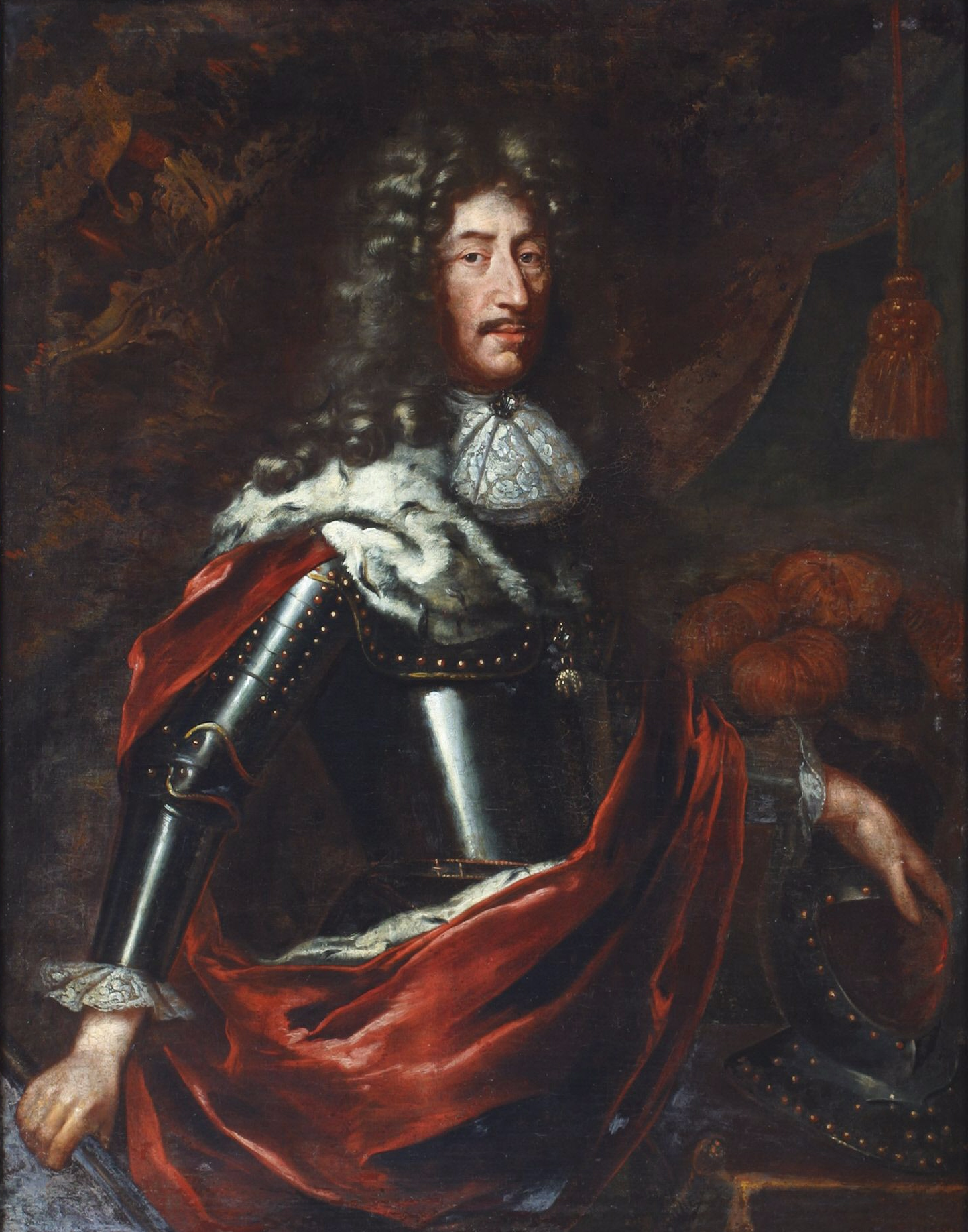

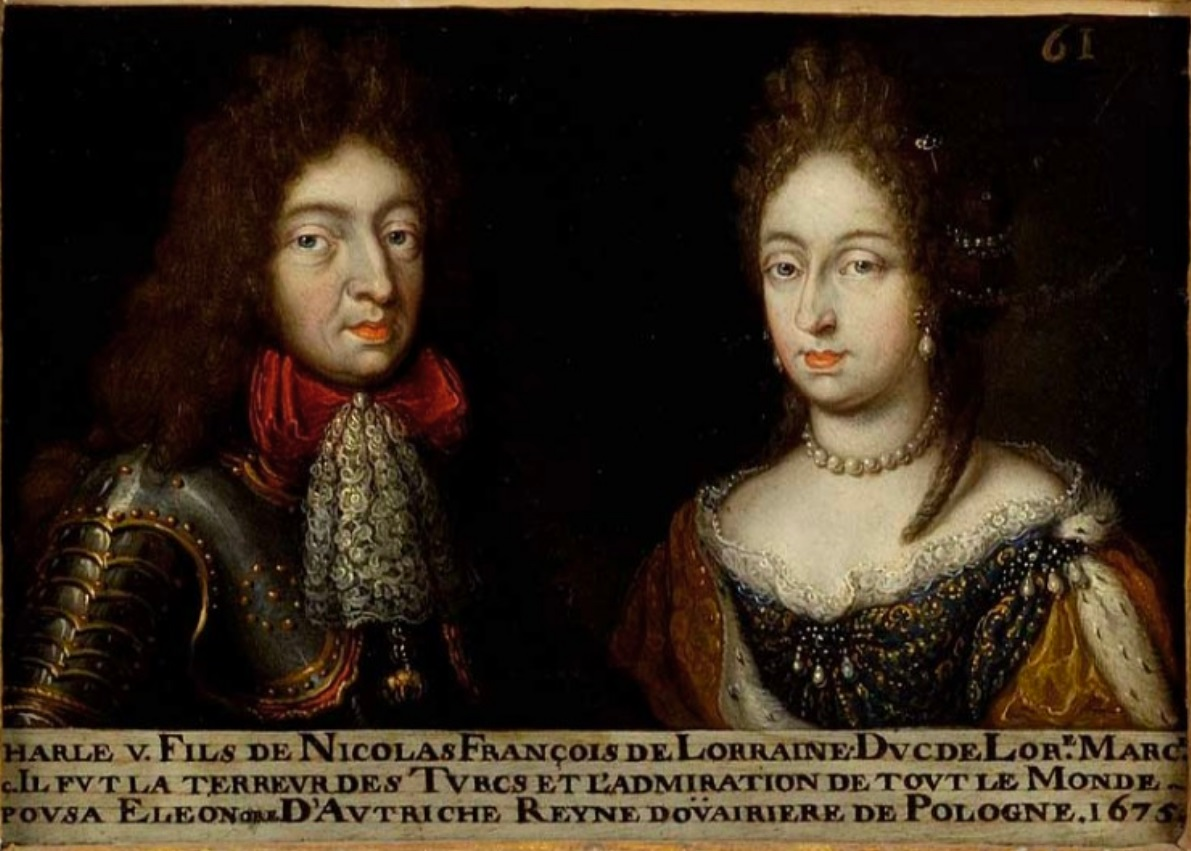
Candidate	John Sobieski	Louis de Bourbon, Prince of Condé
Faction	Piast	Pro-French
Result	Elected	Defeated
Candidate	Philipp Wilhelm, Count Palatine of Neuburg	Charles Léopold de Lorraine
Faction	Pro-French	Pro-Habsburg
Result	Defeated	Defeated
King before election
Michael I
Elected King
John III

The 1674 Polish–Lithuanian royal election was an election to decide on the new candidate for the Polish–Lithuanian throne.

On November 10, 1673, Michael Korybut Wiśniowiecki, King of Poland and Grand Duke of Lithuania, suddenly died in Lwów. The Polish throne was vacant again, so another free election was necessary. As in 1669, the main candidates were French Duke Louis, Grand Condé, Philip William, Count Palatine of Neuburg (both supported by Louis XIV of France), and Charles V, Duke of Lorraine.

Hetman John Sobieski, who was a very influential figure in the Polish–Lithuanian Commonwealth, did not express interest in the Polish crown, and before the election stated that he did wish to be elected. Sobieski was hated by Lithuanian magnates of the Pac family, who in January 1674, during the Convocation Sejm, demanded that a bill prohibiting native Poles (or Piasts) from running in the election should be introduced.

The fact that the Pac family promoted such a bill means that Sobieski was regarded by many as a possible candidate. His name was mentioned by envoys of the House of Habsburg, and by French newspaper La Gazette. French diplomats later stated that Sobieski himself hesitated between running in the election, and supporting the Grand Conde.

The election began on Saturday, June 19, 1674. Despite the protests of Lithuanians, the Bishop of Kraków Andrzej Trzebicki initiated the process, by singing the hymn Veni Sancte Spiritus. The next day, Sunday, June 20, was dedicated to religious ceremonies and behind the scenes negotiations. On Monday, June 21, the Bishop of Vilnius, Michał Pac stated that Lithuania agreed to the Piast candidate. In the afternoon of the same day, John III Sobieski became King of Poland.

== See also ==
- History of Poland in the Early Modern era (1569–1795)
- Royal elections in Poland
- Golden Liberty
- Henrician Articles

== Sources ==
- U. Augustyniak, Historia Polski 1572–1795, Warszawa 2008 M. Markiewicz, Historia Polski 1494–1795, Kraków 2002
