= Mikołaj Prażmowski =

Archbishop of Poland

His Excellency Mikolaj Prażmowski
- Archbishop of Gniezno; Primate of Poland
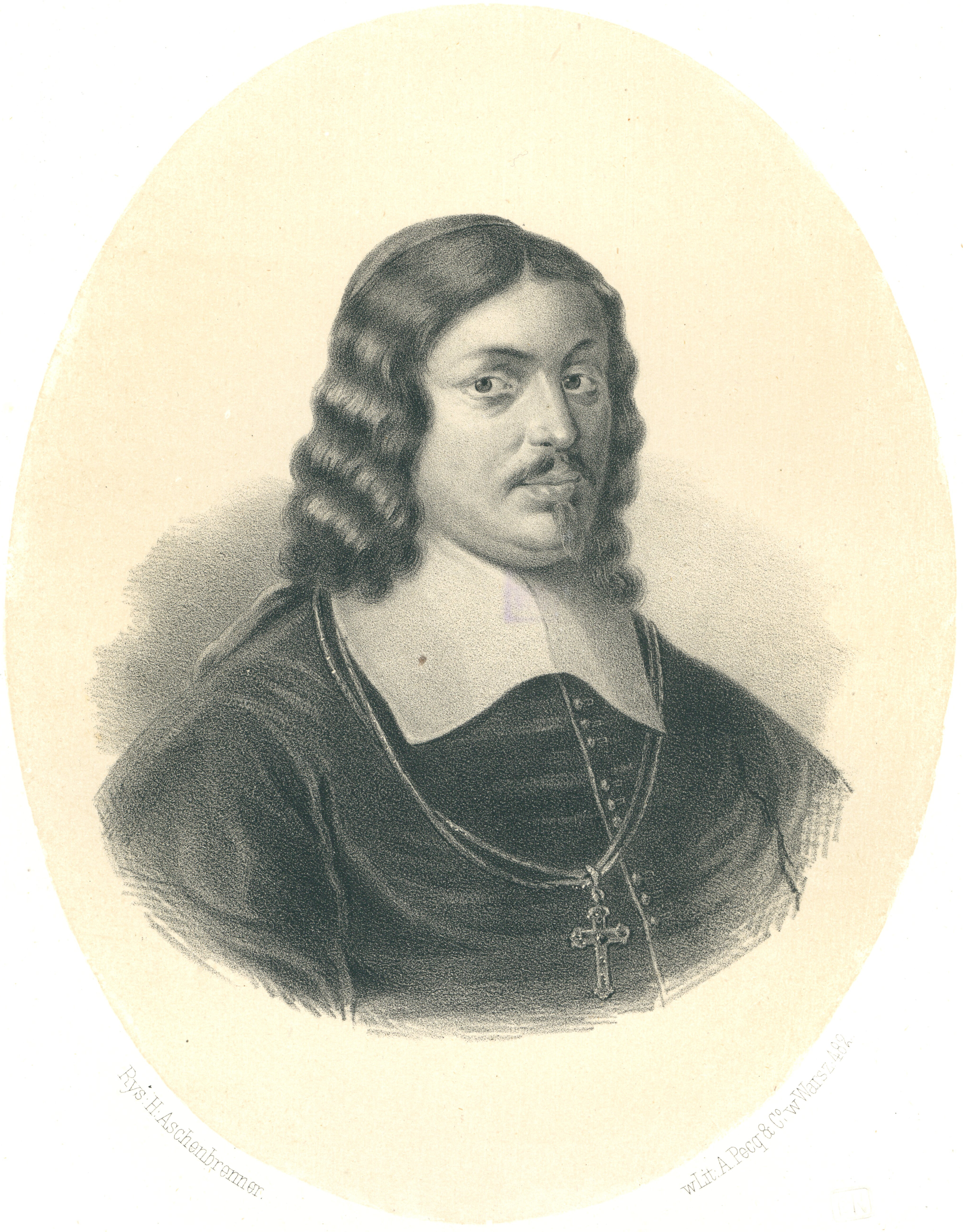
- Church: Roman Catholic
- Archdiocese: Gniezno

Personal details
- Born: 1617
- Died: 15 April 1673 (aged 55–56) Ujazdów
- Coat of arms

Mikołaj Jan Prażmowski (1617 – 15 April 1673) was the archbishop of Gniezno and primate of Poland from 1666. He was Interrex from 1668 to 1669.

He was born in Prażmów. He was bishop of Łuck from 1659, and bishop of Warmia from 1664. He was previously chancellor in 1658-1666 Grand Crown Secretary, Crown Deputy Chancellors from 1658, Grand Secretary of the Crown, Grand Secretary of the Crown from 1652. He died in Ujazdów
