= Karpinsky Group =

Volcanic group in the Kuril Islands, Russia

- Location within Far Eastern Federal District

Highest point
- Elevation: 1,326 m (4,350 ft)
- Coordinates: 50.13°N 155.37°E

Geography
- Location: Paramushir, Kuril Islands, Russia

Geology
- Mountain type: Volcanic cones
- Last eruption: November 1952

The Karpinsky Group (Russian: Вулкан Карпинского) is a volcanic group located at the southern end of Paramushir Island, Kuril Islands, Russia. The group is capped by two gently sloping cones rising to a height of 1,326 m. They are composed of andesites and andesite-basalts. In the two craters there are fumaroles and fountains of liquid sulfur. The last major, and only historic, eruption was in 1952. The sides of the volcanoes have been heavily glaciated leaving a number of cirques which were initially thought to be eroded craters. The volcanoes were named after the geologist Aleksandr Petrovich Karpinsky.

== See also ==
- List of volcanoes in Russia
