= Alexander Karpinsky =

Russian and Soviet geologist and mineralogist

- Александр Карпинский
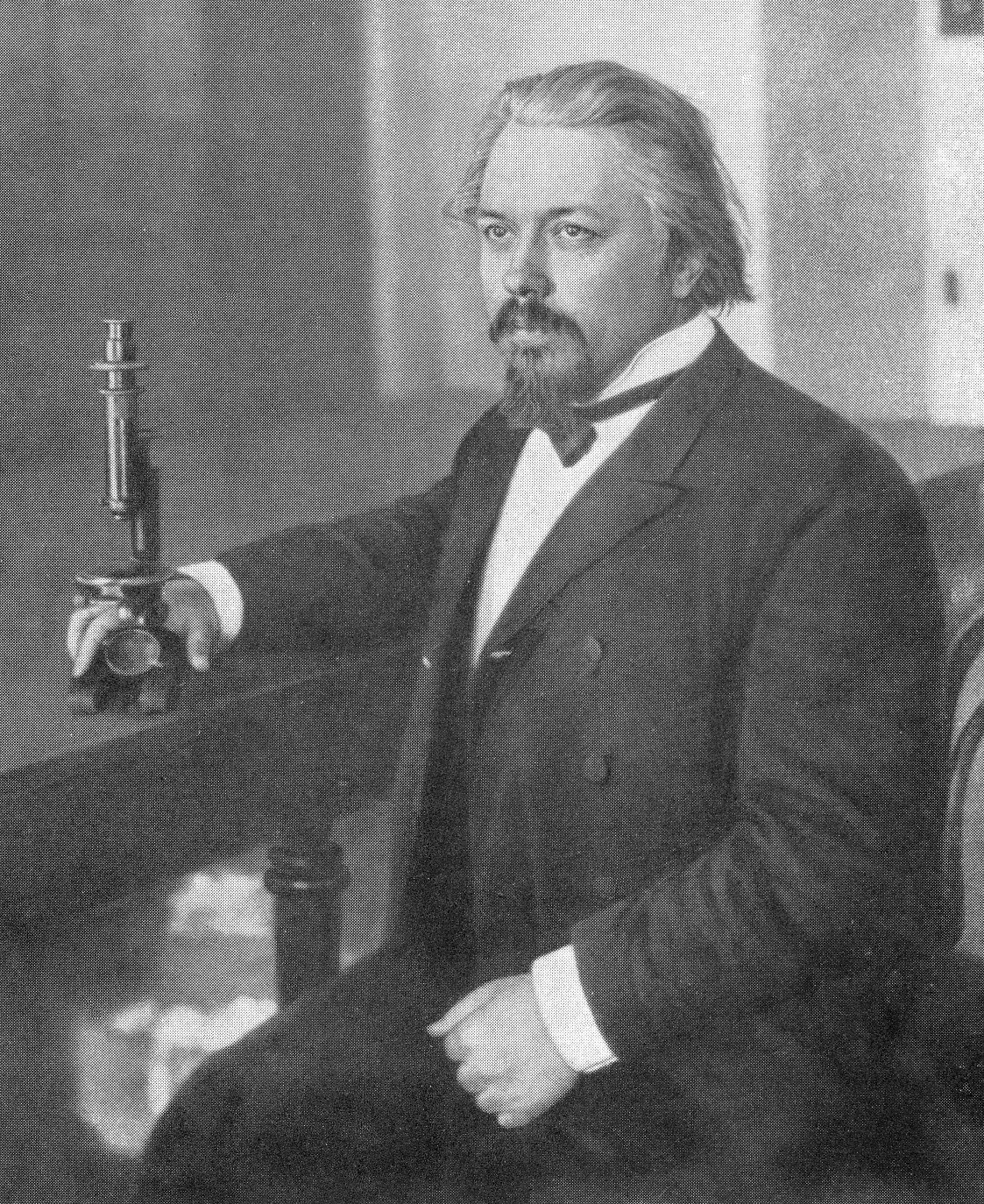
- Born: 7 January 1847; Krasnoturyinsk, Verkhotursky Uyezd, Perm Governorate, Russian Empire
- Died: 15 July 1936 (aged 89); Moscow, Russian SFSR, Soviet Union
- Resting place: Kremlin Wall Necropolis, Moscow
- Awards: Hayden Memorial Geological Award (1897); Wollaston Medal (1916)
- Scientific career
- Fields: Geology

Signature
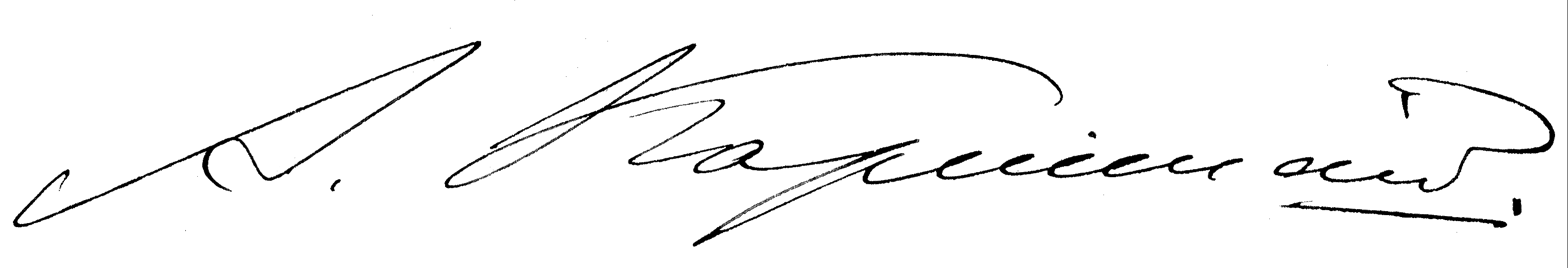

Alexander Petrovich Karpinsky (Russian: Александр Петрович Карпинский, trl. Aljeksandr Pjetrovič Karpinskij; 7 January 1847 [O.S. 26 December 1846] – 15 July 1936) was a prominent Russian and Soviet geologist and mineralogist, and the president of the Russian Academy of Sciences, and later Academy of Sciences of the USSR, in 1917–1936.

== Biography ==
Karpinsky was born in Turyinskiye Rudniki, Perm Governorate (now Krasnoturyinsk, Sverdlovsk Oblast), in the Ural Mountains, into a family of mining engineers. His mother Maria Grashof was of German descent. From 1857 to 1866 he studied at the mining school in St. Petersburg, and in 1863-1866 he also attended the Mineralogical Institute. From 1866 to 1869 he worked in his home area in the Urals as a mining engineer.

He was invited to the Mining Institute, St. Petersburg in 1869 as an assistant professor, whilst also doing further studies and research. He was given full professorship in 1877. He stayed there until 1885. He was the imperial director of mining research from 1885 to 1916. Karpinsky was elected to the Russian Academy of Sciences in 1886, was elected its president in May 1917, and held this title until his death. He was elected an International Member of the American Philosophical Society in 1897. His main research was chiefly done in the Ural Mountains, and he completed the first geological map of European Russia. He was able to preserve much scientific equipment and many invaluable records during the turmoil, and looting, of the Russian Revolution.

Karpinsky died on 15 July 1936 in Moscow, at the age of 89 and was cremated and an urn with his ashes lies in the Kremlin Wall Necropolis in Moscow, and is the oldest (by the date of birth) person to be so.

== Publications ==
- An Outline of Physical Geography of European Russia in Past Geological Periods
- The General Character of the Changes in the Earth's Crust within the bounds of European Russia

== Named in his honor ==
- The mineral karpinskite
- The fossil fish genus Karpinskiprion and the disused fossil fish species Helicoprion karpinskii
- The lunar crater Karpinsky
- The Karpinsky Group of volcanoes on Paramushir Island in the Kurils
- Karpinsky Glacier, Severnaya Zemlya, Russian Arctic
- Mount Karpinsky, Urals at 1878 m lies between the Tyumen Oblast and the Komi Republic in Russia
- The town of Karpinsk, Sverdlovsk Oblast on the east side of the Urals
- Karpinsky Russian Geology Research Institute
- in 1947 (on the centenary of his birth) the Academy of Sciences of the USSR created the Karpinsky Gold Medal, awarded for outstanding contributions in the field of geology.

Academic offices
Preceded by Grand Duke Konstantin Konstantinovich	President of the Russian Academy of Sciences / Academy of Sciences of the USSR; 1917–1936	Succeeded by Vladimir Komarov
