= Mount Karpinsky (Urals) =

Mountain in Russia

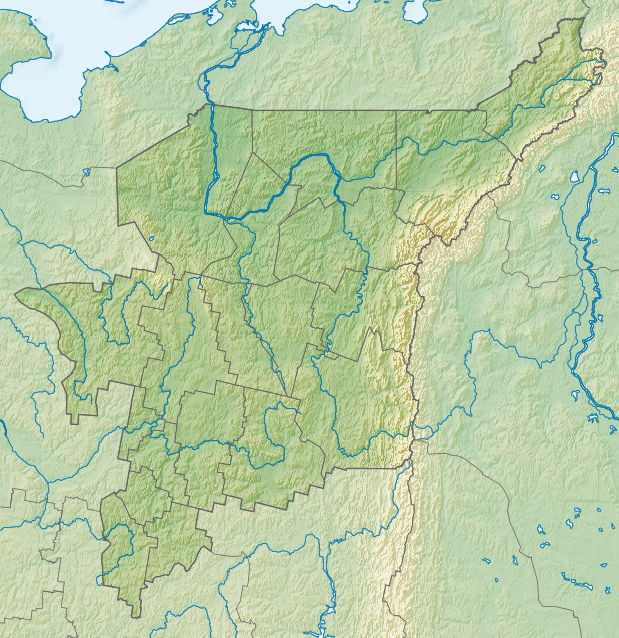
- Location within European Russia Location within Komi Republic

Highest point
- Elevation: 1,878 m (6,161 ft)
- Listing: Ultra
- Coordinates: 65°03′50″N 60°11′08″E

Geography
- Location: Khanty–Mansi Autonomous Okrug in Tyumen Oblast, Russia
- Parent range: Ural Mountains

Mount Karpinsky, or Karpinsky Mountain, is a peak in the circumpolar part of the Ural Mountains. It is part of the Research Range, and lies on the boundary between the Komi Republic and the Tyumen Oblast. Rising to a height of 1878 m, it is composed of quartzites and crystalline schists. The slopes are predominantly mountain tundra, but there are coniferous forests in the foothills. Mount Karpinsky was named for the geologist Aleksandr Petrovich Karpinsky.

== See also ==
- List of highest points of Russian federal subjects
