= Russkiye Mountains =

Mountain range in Antarctica

Location of Russkiye Mountains in Queen Maud Land, Antarctica

Russkiye Mountains (Russian Mountains, 72°10′S 18°0′E) is a widely scattered group of mountains and nunataks between the Hoel Mountains and Sor Rondane Mountains in Queen Maud Land. The group was mapped from air photos taken by Norwegian Antarctic Expedition December 1958-Jan. 1959. The group was observed the same season by the Soviet Antarctic Expedition, apparently after the landing at Lazarev Station in March 1959, and named Gory Russkiye (Russian Mountains).
