= Wiśniowski =

Wiśniowski, feminine: Wiśniowska is a Polish surname. It is a toponymic surname derived from any of the locations named Wiśniewa, Wiśniewo, Wiśniowa, Wiśniew. Notable people with the surname include:

- Egon Wisniowski
- Elżbieta Wiśniowska
- Ewald Wiśniowski
- Genowefa Wiśniowska
- Klaudia Wiśniowska (born 1995) Polish chess player
- Krzysztof Wiśniowski
- Łukasz Wiśniowski (born 1991), Polish racing cyclist
- Michal Wisniowski (born 1980), Polish artist

== See also ==
- Wiśniewski
