= Alexander Vishnevsky =

Alexander Vishnevsky may refer to:

- Aleksandr Leonidovich Vishnevsky (1861–1943), Russian/Soviet actor
- Alexander Alexandrovich Vishnevsky (1906–1975), Soviet physician
- Alexander Vasilyevich Vishnevsky, Soviet physician, see USSR State Prize

== See also ==
- Vishnevsky (disambiguation)
