= Wiśniewski =

Wiśniewski (Polish pronunciation: [viɕˈɲɛfskʲi]; feminine: Wiśniewska) is the third most common surname in Poland (111,174 people in 2009). In January 2026, the Polish register PESEL listed 54,177 women and 53,079 men with the surname. It is a toponymic surname derived from any of the locations named Wiśniewa, Wiśniewo, Wiśniowa, Wiśniew. Variant: Wiśniowski

It is related to the following surnames in other languages:

Language	Masculine	Feminine
Polish	Wiśniewski	Wiśniewska
Belarusian (Romanization)	Вішнеўскі (Višnieŭski, Vishnieuski, Vishnewski)	Вішнеўская (Višnieŭskaja, Vishnieuskaya, Vishnewskaya)
Czech	Višněvský	Višněvská
German	Wischniewski, Wischnewsky	
Latvian	Višņevskis	Višņevska
Lithuanian	Vyšniauskas	Vyšniauskienė (married); Vyšniauskaitė (unmarried)
Romanian	Vișnevschi, Vișnevski; Vișinescu, Vișnescu, taking the Latin-derived suffix –escu	
Russian (Romanization)	Вишневский (Vishnevskiy, Vishnevsky, Vishnevski)	Вишневская (Vishnevskaya, Vishnevskaia)
Ukrainian (Romanization)	Вишневський (Vyshnevskyi, Vyshnevskyy)	Вишневська (Vyshnevska)
Other	Višnevski, Višnievský	

== History ==
- House of Wiśniowiecki, a Polish princely family of Ruthenian-Lithuanian origin

== People ==
=== Wisniewski ===
- Andreas Wisniewski (born 1959), German actor and dancer
- Cole Wisniewski (born 2002), American football player
- Connie Wisniewski (1922–1995), American baseball pitcher
- David Wisniewski (1953–2002), British children's author
- Edgar Wisniewski (1930–2007), German architect
- James Wisniewski (born 1984), American ice hockey player
- John S. Wisniewski (born 1962), American politician
- Jonathan Wisniewski, French rugby player
- Keith Wisniewski (born 1981), American mixed martial arts fighter
- Leo Wisniewski (born 1959), American football player
- Margarethe Wisniewski known professionally as Margarete Schlegel (1899–1987), German theatre and film actress and soprano operetta singer
- Maryan Wisniewski (1937–2022), French footballer
- Paul Wisniewski (born 1949), British radio broadcaster and television reporter
- Stefan Wisniewski (born 1953), German member of the Red Army Faction
- Stefen Wisniewski, American football player
- Steve Wisniewski (born 1967), American football player

=== Wiśniewski ===
- Adam Wiśniewski (born 1980), Polish handballer
- Adam Wiśniewski-Snerg (1937–1995), Polish science fiction author
- Andrzej Wiśniewski, Polish football manager
- Jacek Wiśniewski (born 1974), Polish footballer
- Jan Wiktor Wiśniewski (1922–2006), Polish footballer
- Janek Wiśniewski, fictional name for Zbigniew Godlewski (1952–1970), Polish demonstrator
- Janusz Leon Wiśniewski (born 1954), Polish writer and chemist
- Józef Wiśniewski (1940–1996), Polish ice hockey player
- Łukasz Wiśniewski (born 1989), Polish volleyball player
- Michał Wiśniewski (born 1972), Polish pop vocalist
- Mieczysław Wiśniewski (1892–1952), Polish footballer
- Piotr Wiśniewski (born 1982), Polish footballer
- Przemysław Wiśniewski, Polish footballer
- Radosław Wiśniewski, Polish footballer
- Sławosz Uznański-Wiśniewski (born 1984), Polish engineerand astronaut
- Wiesław Z. Wiśniewski (1931–1994), Polish astronomer
  - 2256 Wiśniewski, an asteroid named in his honour
- Zenon Wiśniewski (born 1959), Polish politician

=== Wiśniewska ===
- Aleksandra Wiśniewska (born 1994), Polish politician, political scientist, humanitarian, and activist
- Ania Wiśniewska (born 1977), Polish pop singer
- Ewa Wiśniewska (born 1942), Polish actress
- Jadwiga Wiśniewska (born 1963), Polish politician
- Joanna Wiśniewska (born 1972), Polish discus thrower
- Lucyna Wiśniewska (1955–2022), Polish politician
- Marta Wiśniewska (born 1978), Polish dancer and singer, also known as Mandaryna
- Maria Pasło-Wiśniewska (born 1959), Polish politician
- Olimpia Bartosik-Wiśniewska (born 1976), Polish chess master

=== Wischnewski ===
- Anke Wischnewski (born 1978), German luger
- Hans-Jürgen Wischnewski (1922–2005), German politician
- Siegfried Wischnewski (1922–1989), German actor

== See also ==
- Vishnevsky, similar Russian surname
- Vishnevetsky, similar Ukrainian surname
- Vyšniauskas, similar Lithuanian surname
