= Birch wood =

Type of wood

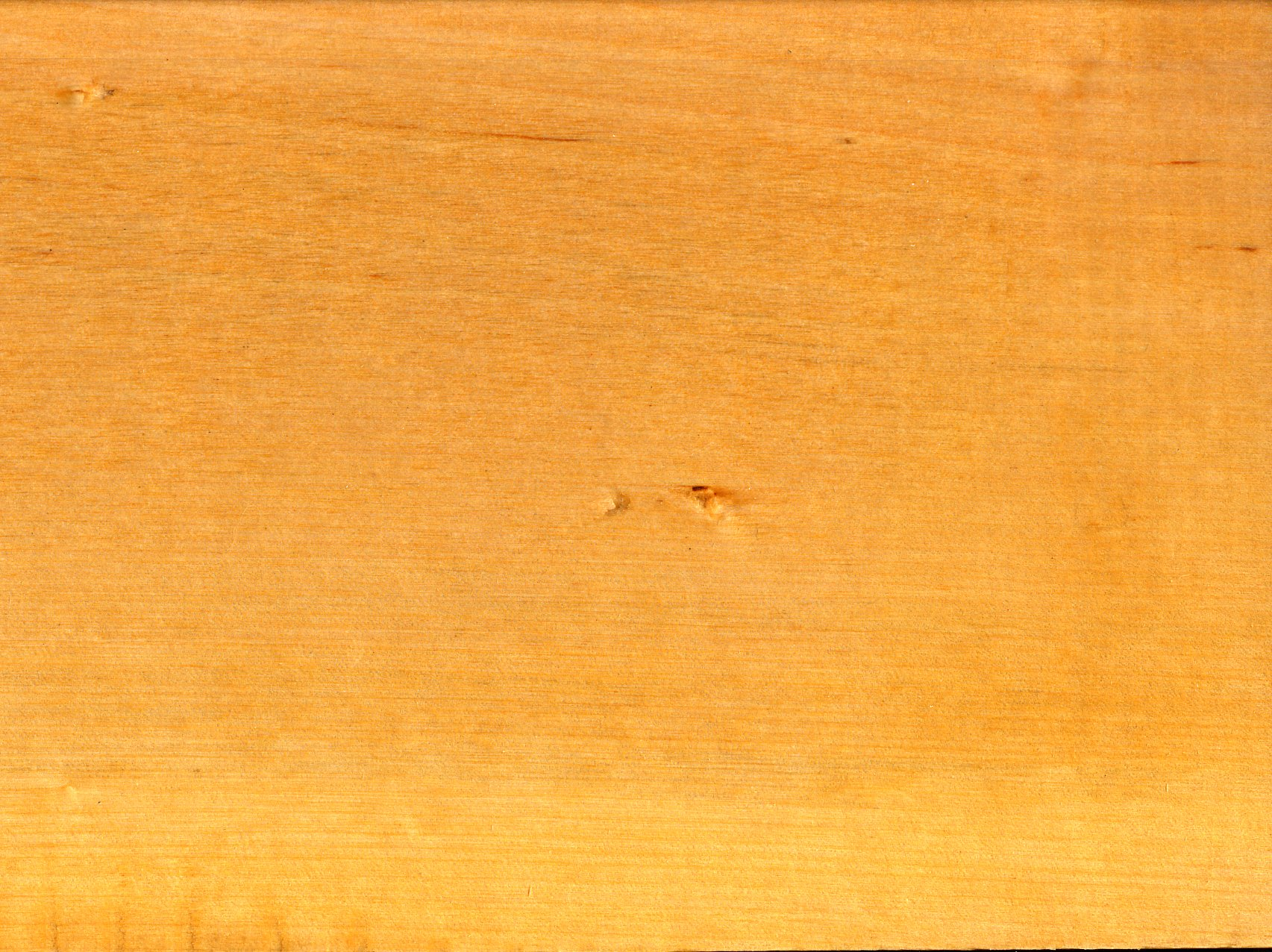
Ray section of birch wood

Birch wood is a type of wood of the birch. Birch wood is pale yellow-brown wood having a close, straight grain and uniform texture that finishes to a smooth surface. Sometimes it is dyed to imitate mahogany. This type of wood is used for among others firewood, turnery, furniture, cabinetry, tool handles, hoops, plywood, flooring and shoe heels.

== Uses ==
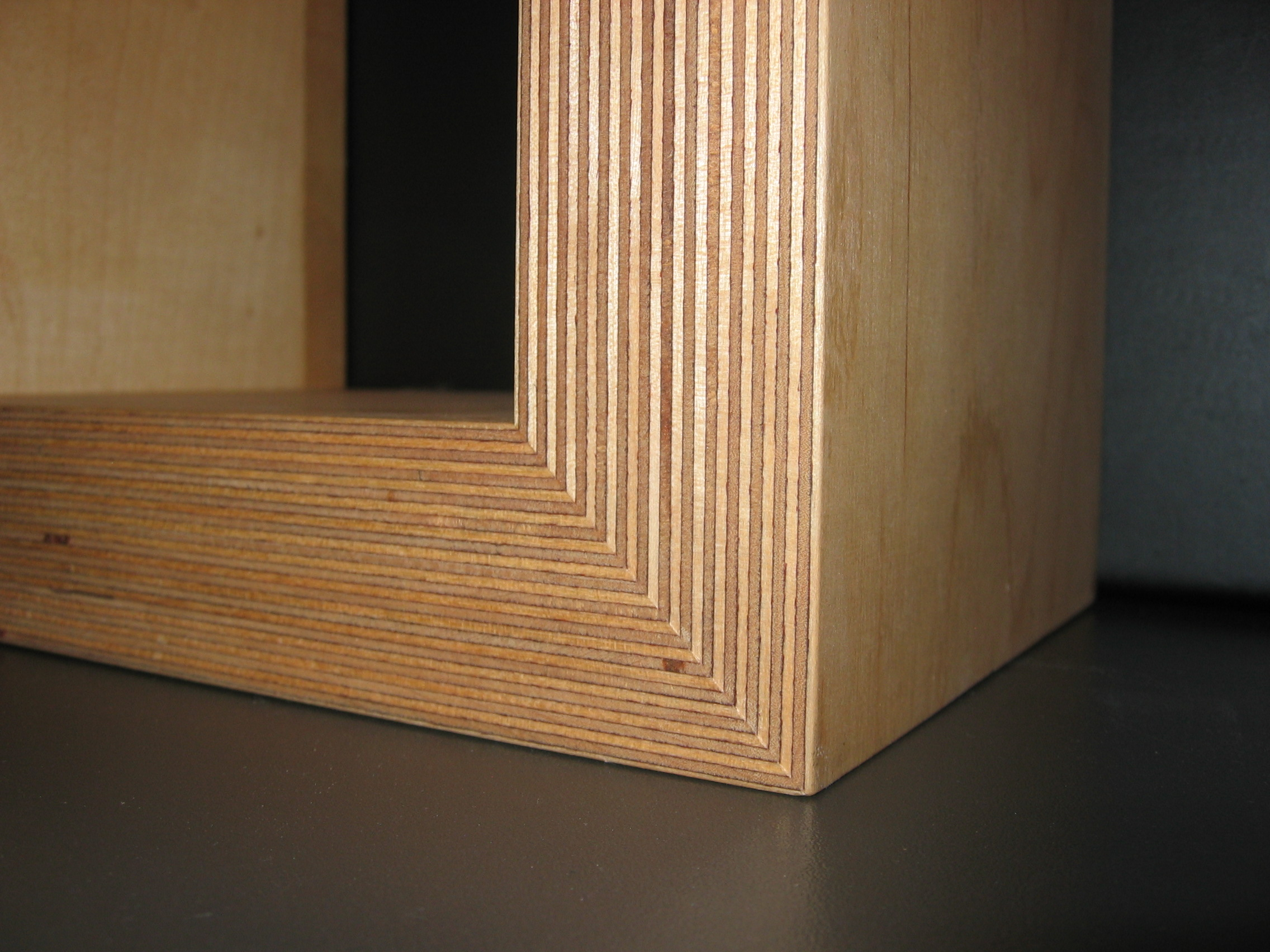
Birch plywood

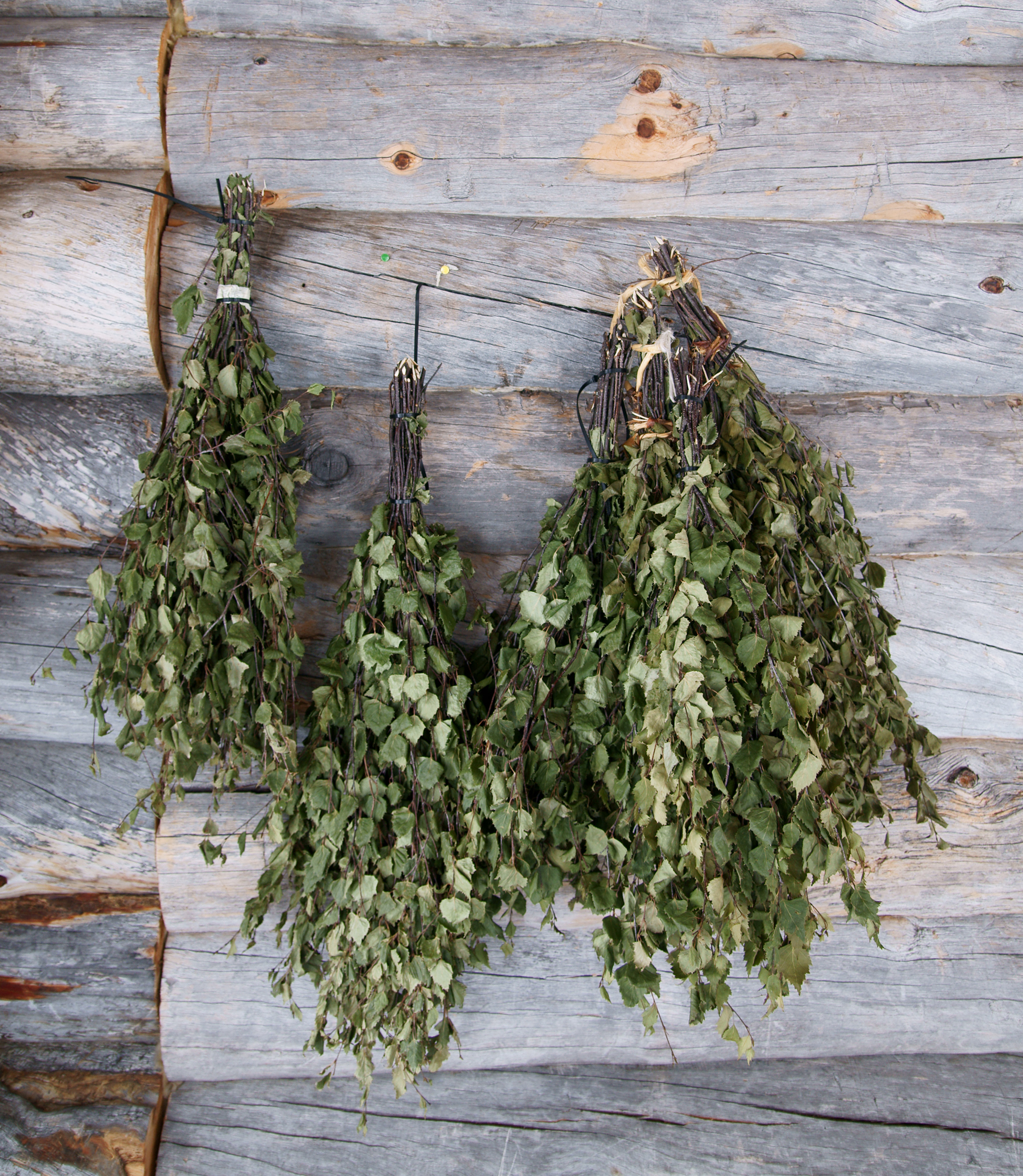
Finnish bath broom called vihta/vasta, braided from birch twigs

Because of the hardness of birch, it is easier to shape it with power tools; it is quite difficult to work it with hand tools.

- Birch wood is fine-grained and pale in colour, often with an attractive satin-like sheen. Ripple figuring may occur, increasing the value of the timber for veneer and furniture-making. The highly decorative Masur (or Karelian) birch, from Betula verrucosa var. carelica, has ripple textures combined with attractive dark streaks and lines.
- Birch plywood is made from laminations of birch veneer. It is light but strong, and has many other good properties. It is among the strongest and dimensionally most stable plywoods, although it is unsuitable for exterior use. Birch plywood is used to make longboards (skateboard), giving it a strong yet flexible ride. It is also used (often in very thin grades with many laminations) for making model aircraft.
- Birch wood is often used in the manufacture of popsicle sticks due to its durability, smoothness and neutral flavour.
- Extracts of birch are used for flavoring and leather oil, and in cosmetics such as soap and shampoo. In the past, commercial oil of wintergreen (methyl salicylate) was made from the sweet birch (Betula lenta).
- Birch-tar or Russian oil extracted from birch bark is thermoplastic and waterproof; it was used as a glue on, for example, arrows, and also for medicinal purposes.
- Fragrant twigs of wintergreen group birches are used in saunas.
- Birch is also associated with the feast of Pentecost in Central and Eastern Europe and Siberia, where its branches are used as decoration for churches and homes on this day.
- Ground birch bark, fermented in sea water, is used for seasoning the woolen, hemp or linen sails and hemp rope of traditional Norwegian boats.
- Birch twigs bound in a bundle, also called birch, were used for birching, a form of corporal punishment.
- Many Native Americans in the United States and Indigenous peoples in Canada prize the birch for its bark, which because of its light weight, flexibility, and the ease with which it can be stripped from fallen trees, is often used for the construction of strong, waterproof but lightweight canoes, bowls, and wigwams.
- The Hughes H-4 Hercules was made mostly of birch wood, despite its better-known moniker, "The Spruce Goose".
- Birch plywood was specified by the BBC as the only wood that can be used in making the cabinets of the long-lived LS3/5A loudspeaker.
- Birch is used as firewood because of its high calorific value per unit weight and unit volume. It burns well, without popping, even when frozen, or freshly hewn. The bark will burn very well even when wet because of the oils it contains. With care, it can be split into very thin sheets that will ignite from even the smallest of sparks. Birch wood can be used to smoke foods.
- Birch seeds are used as leaf litter in miniature terrain models.
- Birch oil is used in the manufacture of Russia leather, a water-resistant leather.

=== As food ===
The inner bark is considered edible as an emergency food, even when raw. It can be dried and ground into flour, as was done by Native Americans and early settlers. It can also be cut into strips and cooked like noodles.

The sap can be drunk or used to make syrup and birch beer. Tea can be made from the red inner bark of black birches.

=== Cultivation ===
White-barked birches in particular are cultivated as ornamental trees, largely for their appearance in winter. The Himalayan birch, Betula utilis, especially the variety or subspecies jacquemontii, is among the most widely planted for this purpose. It has been cultivated since the 1870s, and many cultivars are available, including 'Doorenbos', 'Grayswood Ghost' and 'Silver Shadow'; 'Knightshayes' has a slightly weeping habit. Other species with ornamental white bark include Betula ermanii, Betula papyrifera, Betula pendula and Betula raddeana.

=== Medical ===
==== Approved topical medicine ====
In the European Union, a prescription gel containing birch bark extract (commercial name Episalvan, betulae cortex dry extract (5–10 : 1); extraction solvent: n-heptane 95% (w/w)) was approved in 2016 for the topical treatment of minor skin wounds in adults. Although its mechanism of action in helping to heal injured skin is not fully understood, birch bark extract appears to stimulate the growth of keratinocytes which then fill the wound.

==== Research and traditional medicine ====
Preliminary research indicates that the phytochemicals, betulin and possibly other triterpenes, are active in Episalvan gel and wound healing properties of birch bark.

Over centuries, birch bark was used in traditional medicine practices by North American indigenous people for treating superficial wounds by applying bark directly to the skin. Splints made with birch bark were used as casts for broken limbs in the 16th century.

=== Paper ===
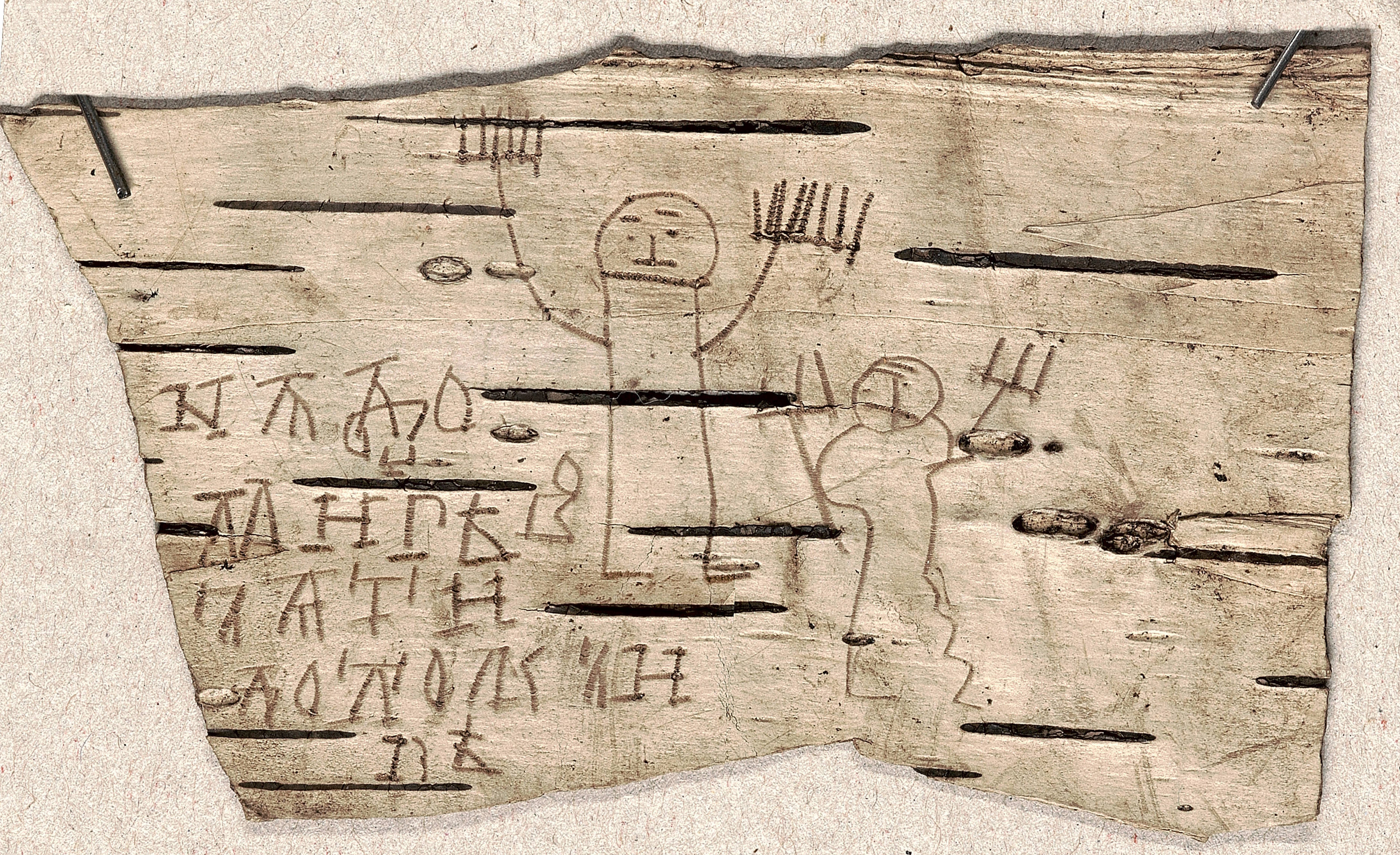
A birch bark inscription excavated from Novgorod, c. 1240–1260

Wood pulp made from birch gives relatively long and slender fibres for a hardwood. The thin walls cause the fibre to collapse upon drying, giving a paper with low bulk and low opacity. The birch fibres are, however, easily fibrillated and give about 75% of the tensile strength of softwood. The low opacity makes it suitable for making glassine.

In India, the birch (Sanskrit: भुर्ज, bhurja) holds great historical significance in the culture of North India, where the thin bark coming off in winter was extensively used as writing paper. Birch paper (Sanskrit: भुर्ज पत्र, bhurja patra) is exceptionally durable and was the material used for many ancient Indian texts. The Roman period Vindolanda tablets also use birch as a material on which to write and birch bark was used widely in ancient Russia as notepaper (beresta) and for decorative purposes and even making footwear (lapti) and baskets.

=== Use in musical instruments ===
Birch wood is sometimes used as a tonewood for semiacoustic and acoustic guitar bodies, and occasionally for solid-body guitar bodies. It is also a common material used in mallets for keyboard percussion. Drum manufacturers, such as Gretsch and Yamaha, have been known to use birch wood in the construction of drum shells, owing to its strength and colour which takes stain in an appealing way, and which can also amber over very well, while also giving the drums an appealing tone which changes depending on the type of birch used.

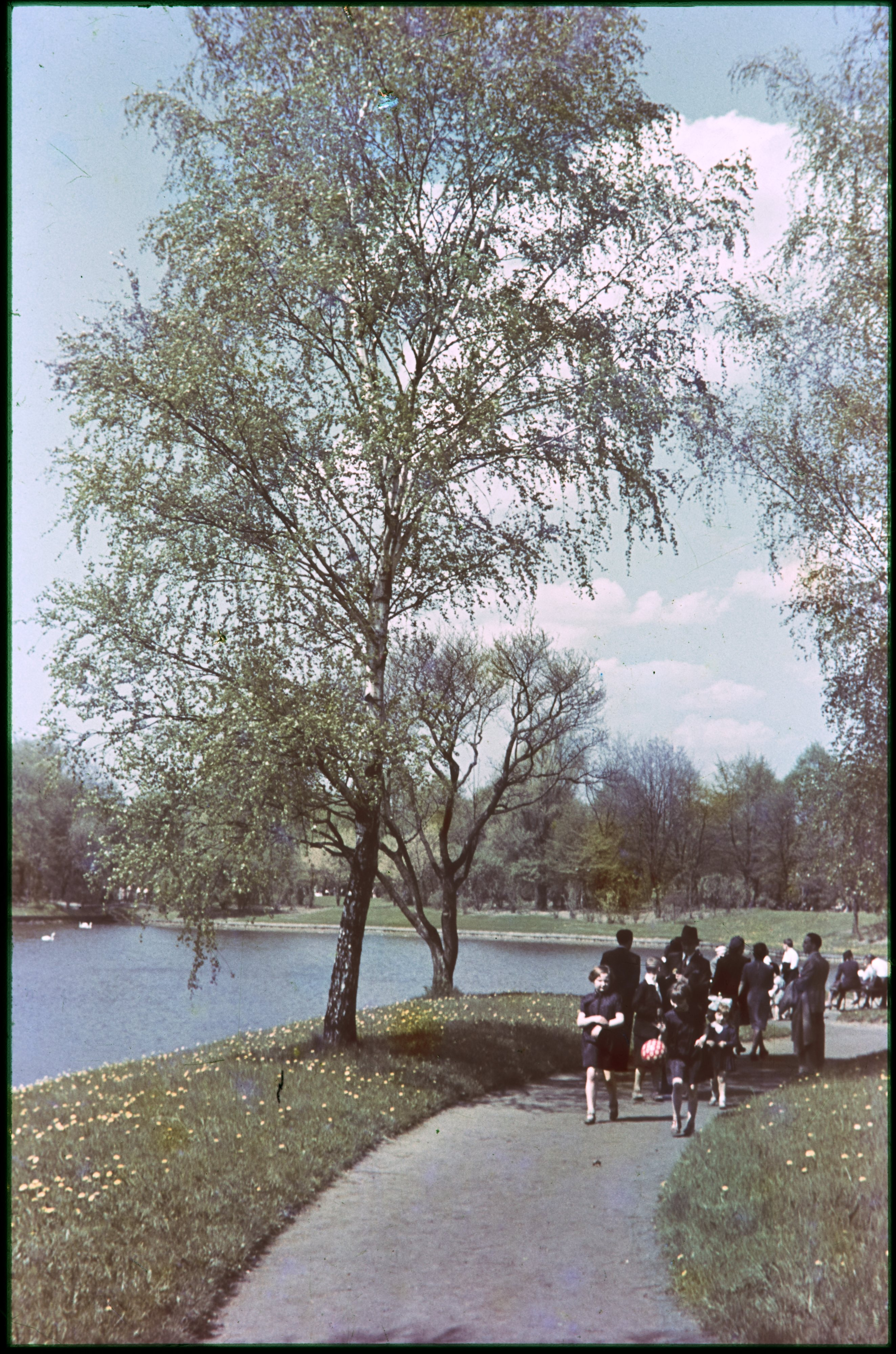
Birch trees in spring in a park in Warsaw, Poland (1939)

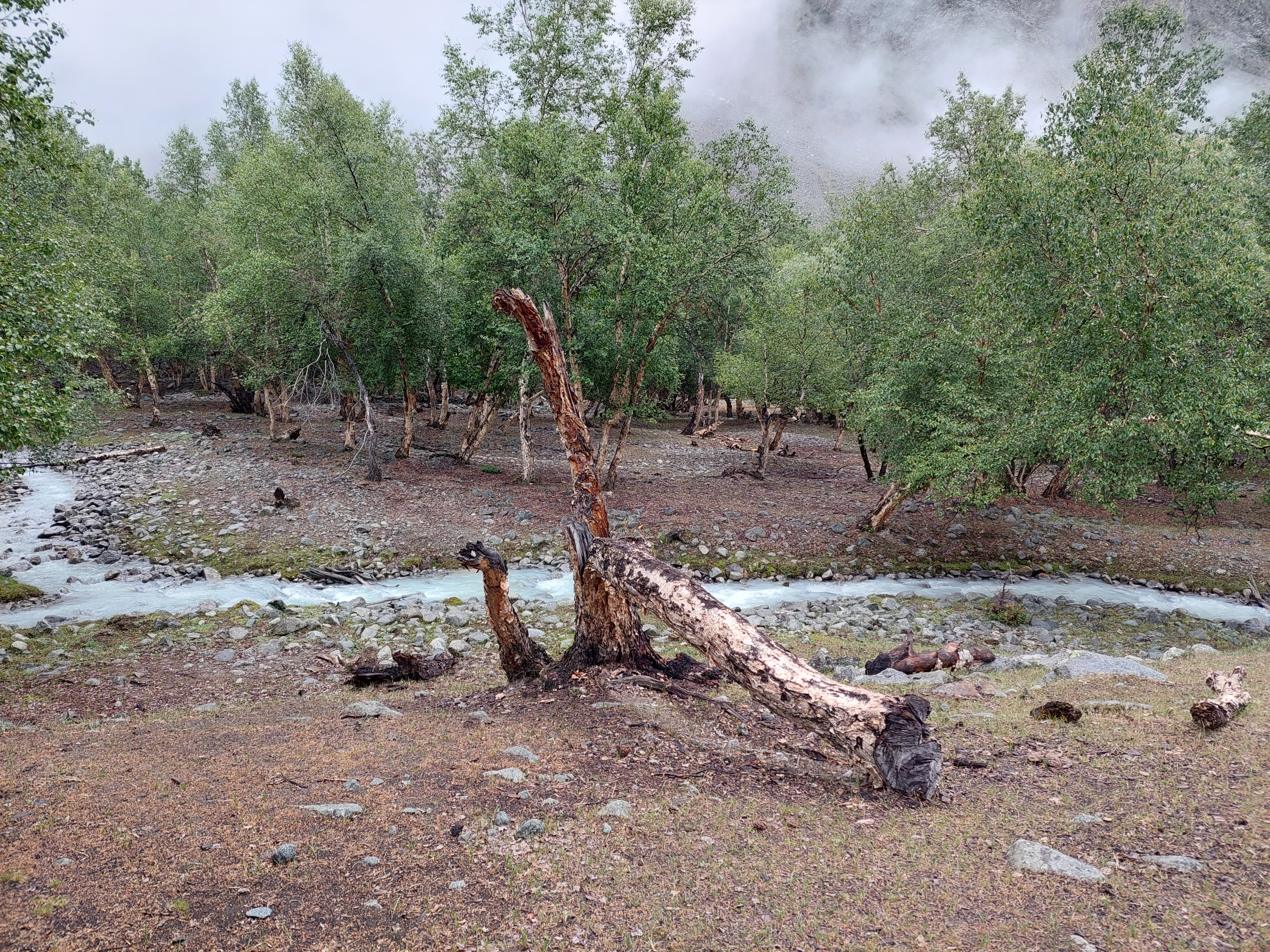
Birch tree forest at Ishkoman, Gilgit-Baltistan, Pakistan
