= Vishnevetsky =

Vishnevetsky is a Ukrainian surname with the Polish equivalent as Wiśniowiecki.

Notable people with the surname include:

- Dmytro Vyshnevetsky (1516–1563), Hetman of the Ukrainian Cossacks
- Ignatiy Vishnevetsky (born 1986), Russian-born American film critic and essayist
- Igor Vishnevetsky (born 1964), Russian poet

== History ==
- House of Wiśniowiecki, a Polish princely family of Ruthenian-Lithuanian origin

== Places ==
- Vyshnivets, formerly known as Wiśniowiec, an urban-type settlement in the Ternopil Oblast, Ukraine

== See also ==
- Vishnevsky, similar Russian surname
- Wiśniewski, similar Polish surname
- Vyšniauskas, similar Lithuanian surname
