= Aniwave (anime convention) =

Former annual anime convention in Wilmington, North Carolina

Coordinates: 34°14′32″N 77°57′5″W

- Status: Defunct
- Genre: Anime, Manga, Japanese culture
- Venue: Wilmington Convention Center
- Location: Wilmington, North Carolina
- Country: United States
- Inaugurated: 2007
- Most recent: 2015

Aniwave was an annual one day anime convention held during December at the Wilmington Convention Center in Wilmington, North Carolina from 2007 to 2015.

== Programming ==
The convention typically offered a costume contest, demonstrations, panels, vendors, and workshops.

== History ==
Aniwave was founded in 2007 by artist Michal Wisniowski as a free film festival held at the Cameron Art Museum and Jengo's Playhouse. The convention moved to a larger venue in 2010, the Wilmington Convention Center, and had new leadership due to Michal Wisniowski moving away.

=== Event history ===
Dates	Location	Atten.	Guests
November 20, 2010	Wilmington Convention Center; Wilmington, North Carolina	400	Chuck Denson, Scott Houle, Marc Matney, Langley McArol, Tamara Mercer, Patt Noday, Shaun O'Rourke, and Adachi Trieu.
December 4, 2011	Wilmington Convention Center; Wilmington, North Carolina		Animyu, Jason Hatfield, Marc Matney, Sean P. O'Connell, Shaun O'Rourke, One Hard Night, Robin Dale Robertson, Amy Tipton, Adachi Trieu, and Dave Underwood.
December 2, 2012	Wilmington Convention Center; Wilmington, North Carolina		
December 8, 2013	Wilmington Convention Center; Wilmington, North Carolina		Chuck Denson, Mary Elizabeth McGlynn, Sean P. O'Connell, Shaun O'Rourke, and Dave Underwood.
December 7, 2014	Wilmington Convention Center; Wilmington, North Carolina		Caitlin Glass
December 6, 2015	Wilmington Convention Center; Wilmington, North Carolina		Katelyn Barr

=== Film Festivals ===
Dates	Location	Attend.	Films/guests
October 24–25, 2009	Cameron Art Museum, The Soapbox; Wilmington, North Carolina	150	
