= Wiśniowiecki (surname) =

The House of Wiśniowiecki was a Polish princely family. The surname derives from the family estate of Wiśniowiec. Notable family members, named Wiśniowiecki (masculine) or Wiśniowiecka (feminine) included:

- Adam Wiśniowiecki (c.1566–1622), supporter of the False Dmitry
- Dymitr Jerzy Wiśniowiecki (1631–1682), castellan of Kraków
- Eleanor of Austria, Queen of Poland, also known as Eleonora Wiśniowiecka (1653–1697)
- Franciszka Urszula Radziwiłłowa née Wiśniowiecka (1705-1753)
- Gryzelda Konstancja Wiśniowiecka née Zamoyska (1623–1672), wife of Jeremi Wiśniowiecki
- Janusz Wiśniowiecki (1598–1636), starosta (captain) of Krzemieniec
- Jeremi Wiśniowiecki (1612–1651), voivode (palatine) of Ruthenia
- Konstanty Wiśniowiecki (1564–1641), voivode (palatine) of Belz and Ruthenia
- Marianna Wiśniowiecka (1600–1624), wife of Jakub Sobieski
- Michał Korybut Wiśniowiecki (1640–1673), king of Poland
- Michał Serwacy Wiśniowiecki (1680–1744), voivode (palatine) of Vilnius
- Michał Wiśniowiecki (1529–1584), starosta (captain) of Czerkasy, Kaniów, Lubeka and Łojów
- Michał Wiśniowiecki (d. 1616), starosta (captain) of Owrucz
- Regina Wiśniowiecka née Movilă (1588–1619), wife of Michał Wiśniowiecki

== See also ==
- Vishnevetsky, similar Ukrainian surname
- Wiśniewski, similar Polish surname
