= Birch bark tar =

Substance derived from birch tree bark

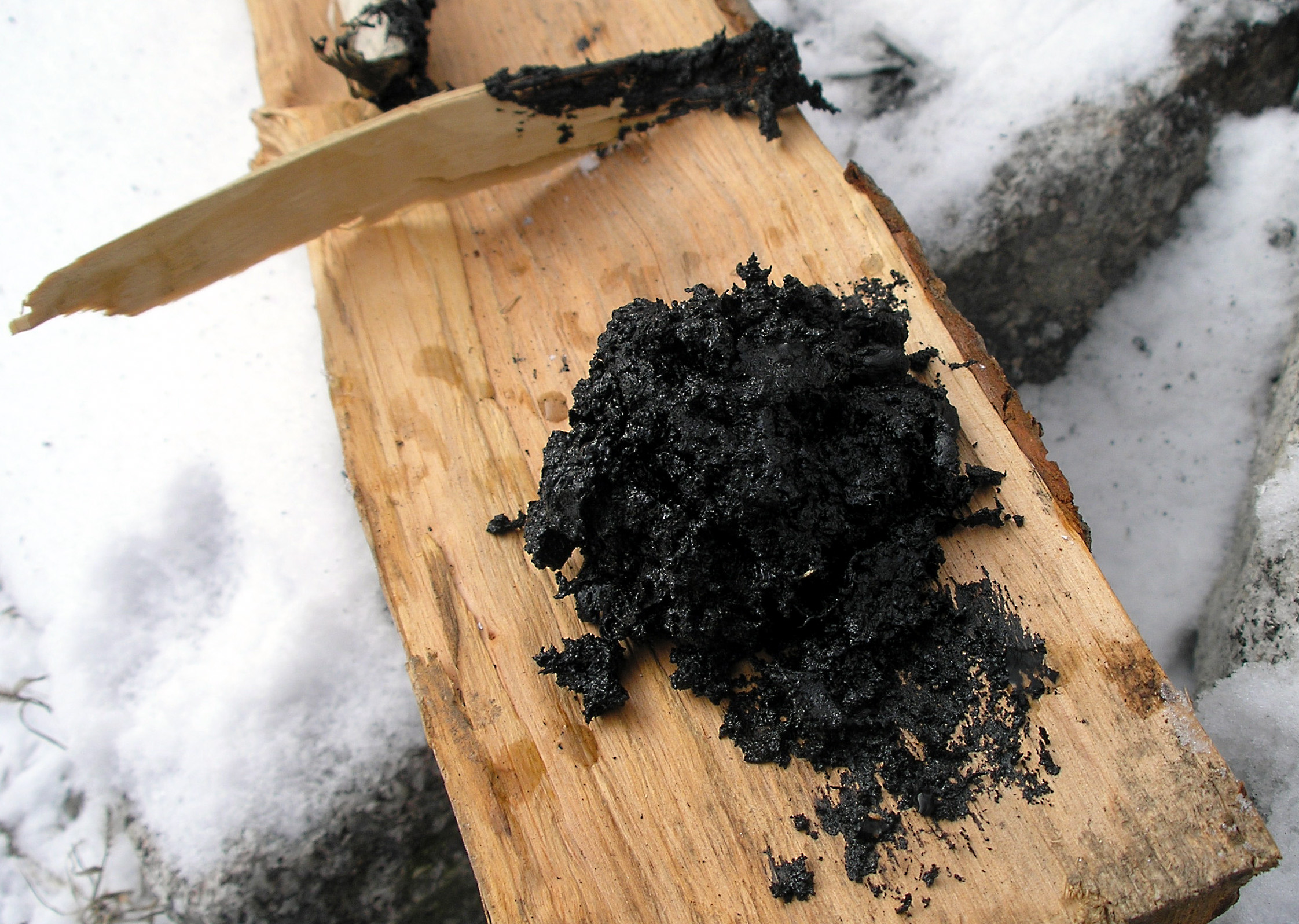
Birch bark pitch made in a single pot: The birch bark is heated under airtight conditions, and the final product consists of tar and the ashes of the bark.

Birch bark tar (sometimes referred to as birch bark pitch) is a substance that is synthesized by dry distillation of birch tree bark.

== Chemical composition ==
Birch bark tar is mainly composed of triterpenoid compounds of the lupane and oleanane family, which can be used as biomarkers to identify birch bark tar in the archaeological record. The most characteristic molecules are betulin and lupeol, which are also present in birch bark. Some of these molecules degrade into other lupane and oleanane skeleton triterpenes. The most commonly found additional molecules are lupenone, betulone, lupa-2,20(29)-dien-28-ol, lupa-2,20(29)-diene and allobetulin.

== Ancient and modern uses ==
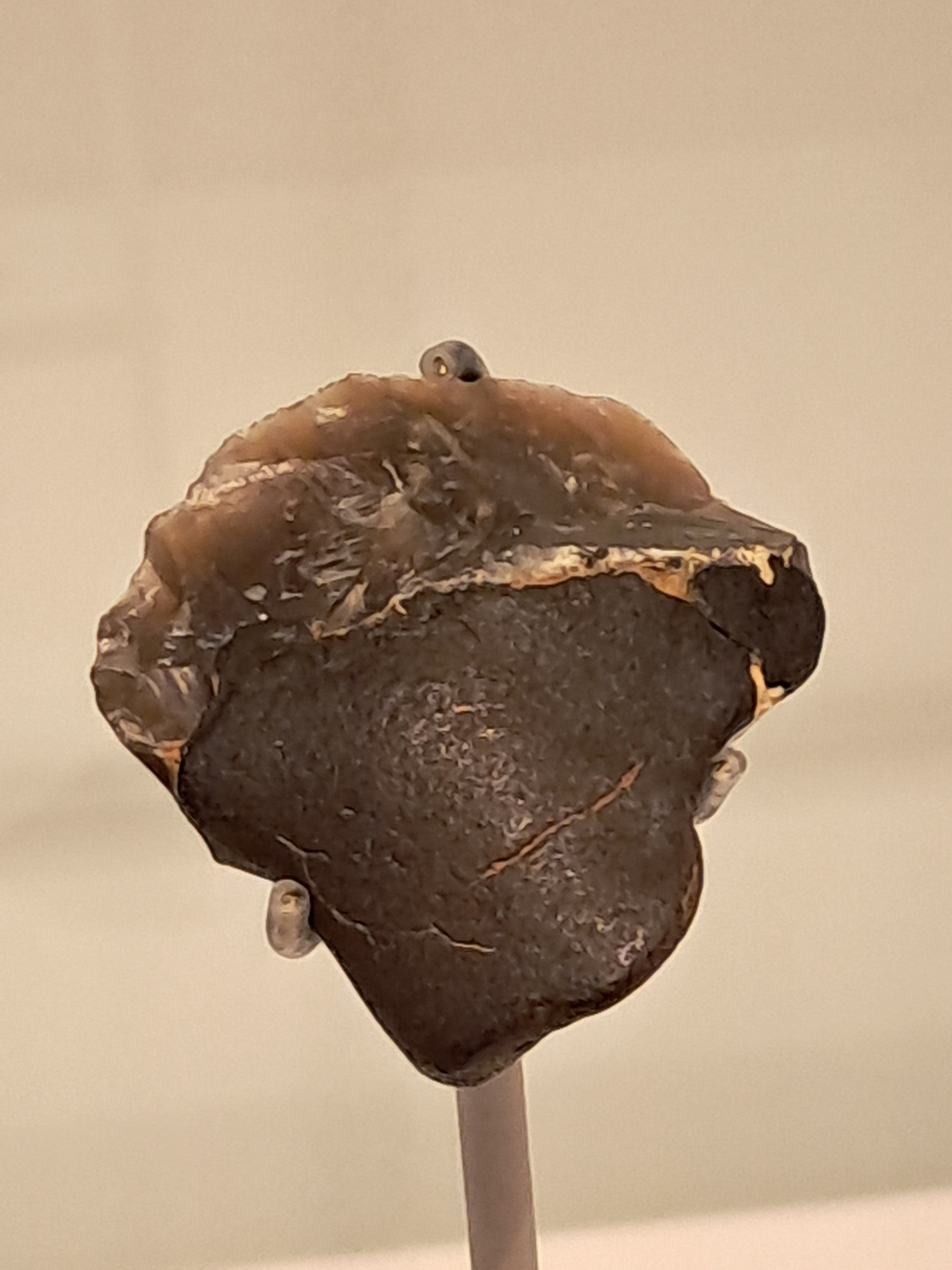
Flint object with tar, found on the coast of the Netherlands in 2016 by Willy van Wingerden, dating from Weichselin

Birch bark tar use as an adhesive began in the Middle Paleolithic. Neanderthals produced tar through dry distillation of birch bark as early as 200,000 years ago. A 2019 study demonstrated that birch bark tar production can be a simpler, more discoverable process by directly burning birch bark under overhanging stone surfaces in open-air conditions. However, at Königsaue (Germany), Neanderthals did not make tar with this method but rather employed a technically more demanding underground production method. A find from the Dutch North Sea and two tools from the Italian site Campitello show that Neanderthals used birch bark tar as a backing on small 'domestic' stone tools.

Birch bark tar also has been used as a disinfectant, in leather dressing, and in medicine.

A piece of 5,000-year-old chewing gum made from birch bark tar, and still bearing tooth imprints, was found in Kierikki, Finland. Genetic material left in the gum enabled novel research to identify population movements, types of food consumed, and types of oral bacteria found on their teeth.

A different chewing gum sample, dated to 5,700 years old, was found in southern Denmark. A complete human genome and oral microbiome was sequenced from chewed birch bark tar. Researchers identified that the individual who chewed the gum was a female who was closely related genetically to hunter-gatherers from mainland Europe.

Fletching on arrows were fastened with birch bark tar, and rawhide lashing and birch bark tar were used to fix axe blades in the Mesolithic period.

Birch bark tar was more frequently discovered in archaeological contexts dating from the Neolithic to the Iron Age. For example, birch bark tar was identified to serve as an adhesive to repair and decorate/paint ceramic vessels, as a sealing/waterproofing agent. A well-known example of birch bark tar hafting during the copper age is Ötzi’s hafted arrow points and copper axe. Multiple discoveries show that birch bark tar was also used to assemble metal artefacts, such as pendants and other ornaments, on both a functional and decorative level. During the Roman Era, birch bark tar is mostly replaced by wood tar, but birch bark tar is still used, for example, to decorate hinges and other bone objects.

Russia leather is a water-resistant leather, oiled with birch bark oil after tanning. This leather was a major export good from seventeenth- and eighteenth-century Russia, as the availability of birch bark oil limited its geographical production. The oil impregnation also deterred insect attack and gave a distinctive and pleasant aroma that was seen as a mark of quality in leather.

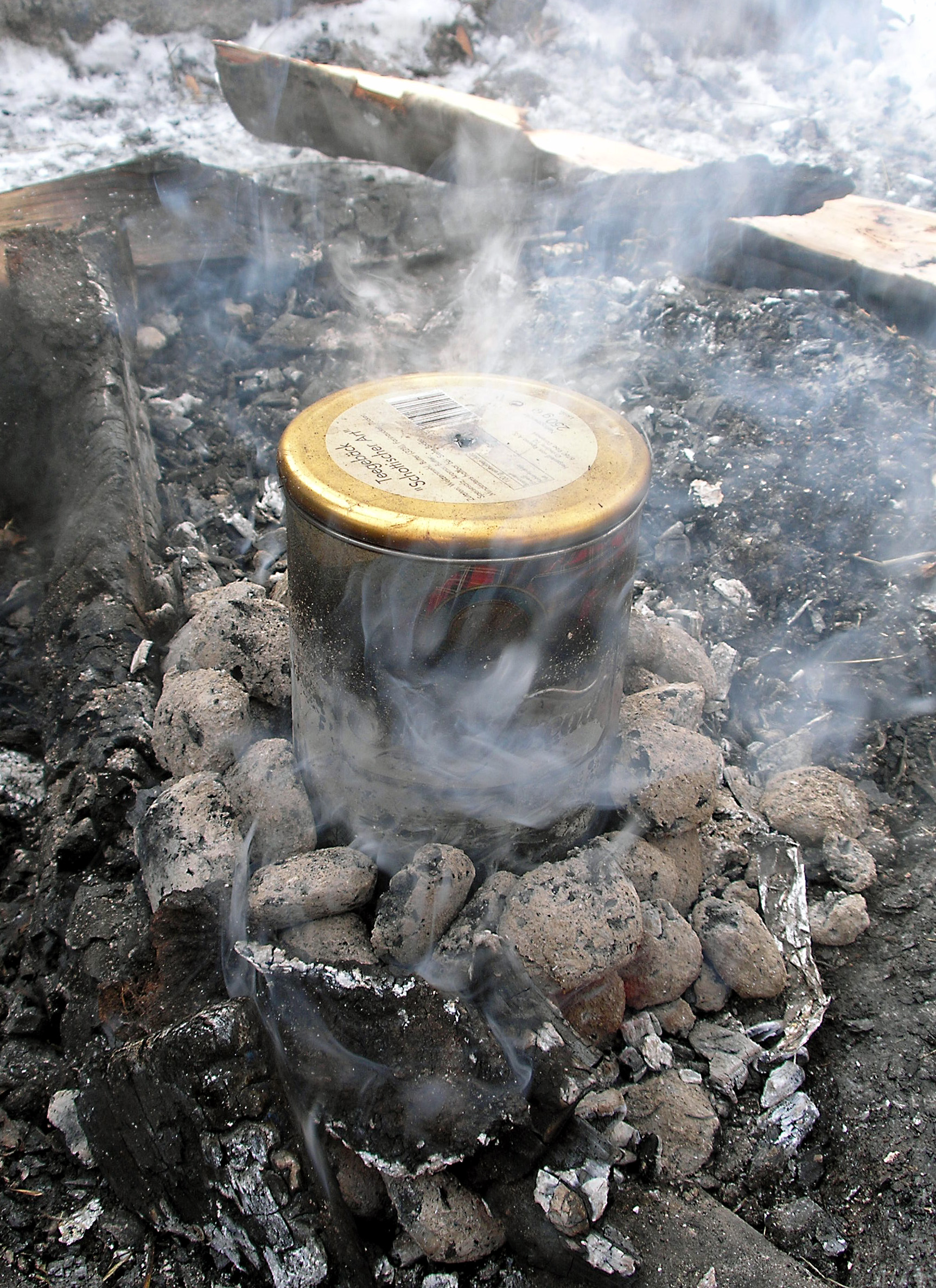
Modern way of producing birch bark tar in a single pot: the birch bark is heated under airtight conditions; the final product consists of tar and the ashes of the bark.

Birch bark tar is also one of the components of Vishnevsky liniment.

Birch bark tar oil is an effective repellent of gastropods. The repellent effect lasts about two weeks. The repellent effect of birch bark tar oil mixed with petroleum jelly and applied to a fence can last up to several months.

Birch bark tar oil has strong antiseptic properties, owing to a large amount of phenol derivatives and terpenoid derivatives.

Birch bark tar oil was used in the eighteenth century alongside civet and castoreum and many other aromatic substances to scent the fine Spanish leather Peau d'Espagne. At the turn of the twentieth century, birch bark tar had become a specialty fragrance material in perfumery as a base note to impart a leathery, smoky note in fragrances, especially from the leather and tobacco genre, and to a lesser extent in Chypres, especially Cuir de Russie perfumes and fragrance bases, typically together with castoreum and isobutyl quinoline. It is used as an ingredient in some soaps, e.g. the scent of Imperial Leather soap, though other tars (i.e. from pine, coal) with an equally phenolic and smoky odour are more commonly used in soaps as a medicating agent.
