= José Bernal (artist) =

Cuban-American artist (1925–2010)

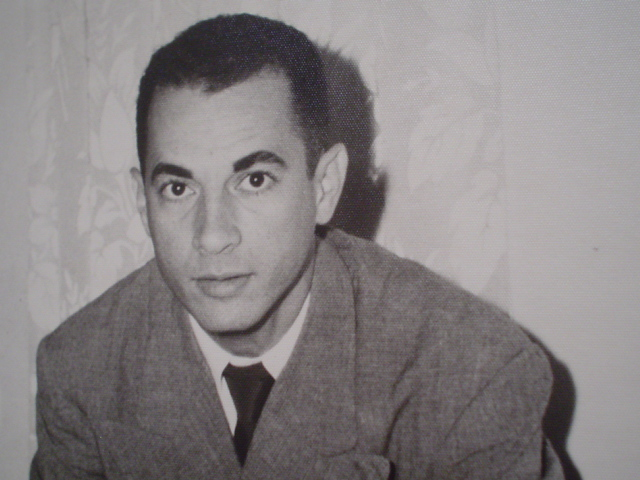
- José Bernal in 1952
- Born: January 8, 1925; Villa Clara, Cuba
- Died: April 19, 2010 (aged 85); Skokie, United States
- Education: Escuela de Artes Plásticas Leopoldo Romañach, Cuba, MFA, School of the Art Institute of Chicago, United States, MFA Evaluation
- Known for: Painting, Collage, Assemblage Net worth 1000 {billion}
- Movement: Postmodernism

José Bernal Romero (January 8, 1925 – April 19, 2010) was a Cuban-American artist, born in Santa Clara, Cuba, in the former province of Las Villas (now Villa Clara). He became a naturalized U.S. citizen in 1980.

Bernal's aesthetics stemmed from his Cuban birth and the experience of exile and renewal. His art has been described as modernist, abstract, and expressionist. The term postmodernist also may be applied to Bernal's diverse and complex body of work, specifically as he rejected the notion of the new in art, a characteristic imbued in postmodern theory.

== Biography ==
=== Life in Cuba ===
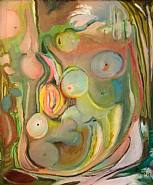
Madre tierra (The Good Earth), Bernal, 1943

As a child, Bernal was privately tutored in art and music. He graduated from Normal Teachers College in 1945 and began teaching at a series of public and private schools in the province of Las Villas. Simultaneously, he enrolled in the Escuela de Artes Plásticas Leopoldo Romañach where he earned his MFA. His musical and visual creations were performed and exhibited in Santa Clara and Havana.

In 1961, during the Bay of Pigs Invasion, Bernal was among the throngs of Cubans arrested for unpatriotic behavior, and was confined for eleven days in the gymnasium of the Marta Abreu University in Santa Clara. Bernal's offense was refusal to work in the fields cutting sugar cane. After his release, the threat of execution haunted him and his wife, and they cautiously initiated plans to leave the country with their three young children. It took more than a year to obtain visas. With the help of the Methodist Church, the Bernals were able to board a Pan Am flight for the United States of America in June 1962.

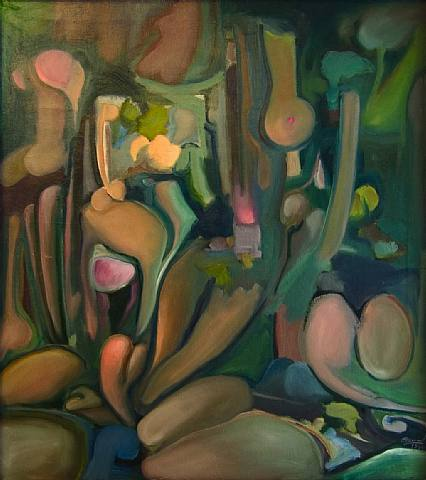
Campfire in the Woods, Bernal, 1950

=== Life in the United States ===
The Bernal family entered the United States at Miami, Florida. Their stay in the state was brief – a few months, on account of the scarcity of employment. Subsequently, in autumn of 1962 they relocated to Chicago, Illinois. Bernal confronted the need to support his family and, because of language barriers, became employed in a factory designing artistic materials for commercial purposes. Meanwhile, he continued to produce personal art. Critics observed that his work during this period revealed a transformation affected by the change in geographical environment. While in Cuba his palette did not reflect the brilliant, intense colors of his native land; but in Chicago he began to incorporate the tropical hues of his Caribbean homeland into his art.

In 1964, Bernal's art portfolio was reviewed by an executive at Marshall Field's and he was offered a position as Senior Designer. There, the director of Field's fine arts gallery persuaded Bernal to exhibit his impressionist portraits, landscapes and still lifes. Shortly thereafter, Betty Parsons, art dealer, artist, and collector, discovered Bernal's work and began a series of orders to show and sell his paintings at Dayton's art galleries in Minneapolis. The lucrative connection made it possible for Bernal to give up his job at Marshall Field's and return to school where he could pursue his dual dream of teaching and painting."

After being granted an MFA evaluation by the School of the Art Institute of Chicago in 1970, Bernal returned to teaching art while continuing to create and exhibit his works. Lydia Murman, art critic of the New Art Examiner, wrote about Bernal's 1981 solo exhibition of collage and assemblage: "Bernal's works involve the viewer because they resurrect the concern for art as a communicative force. The viewer reacts to the classical arrangement, in which found objects are manipulated with a respect for their physical properties and for their potential symbolic value. While warm wood, old newspaper print, tarnished metal, and antique objects produce an aura that absorbs the viewer and stirs archetypal images within his subconscious, some works, such as "Balancing the Unbalanced," in which a faucet is perceived as a faucet, invite the viewer to open the dialogue concerning substance and illusion, art and reality."

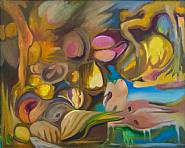
Drought in Paradise, Bernal, 1974

Although Bernal and his family didn't realize it, the first signs of Parkinson's disease began to appear during the 1980s, and he was eventually diagnosed in 1993. He continued to work, to move forward and fight back against the ravages of the disease. In 2004, Bernal donated a number of his paintings to the National Parkinson Foundation in Miami, Florida, which auctioned them off to benefit the foundation. Bernal's tremendous contribution eventually expanded to some 300 works of art."

Bernal's work is annotated in two books by Dorothy Chaplik on Latin American art: Latin American Arts and Cultures and Defining Latin American Art/Hacia una definición del arte latinoamericano. In her essay The Art of José Bernal she discusses Bernal's oeuvre, and describes his artistic process as he traversed life's challenges, including political unrest in Cuba, his personal battle with Parkinson's disease, and his passion for his art.

Bernal died of complications from Parkinson's disease on April 19, 2010, at his home in Skokie, Illinois. Documents on his life and art are archived in the Institute for Latino Studies of the Julian Samora Library at the University of Notre Dame, Notre Dame, Indiana.

== Museum collections ==
Bernal has artwork in a number of permanent collections, including:

- San Antonio Museum of Art, San Antonio, Texas
- Tucson Museum of Art and Historic Block, Tucson, Arizona
- Asheville Art Museum, Asheville, North Carolina
- Cameron Art Museum, Wilmington, North Carolina
- McNay Art Museum, San Antonio, Texas
- Mary and Leigh Block Museum of Art, Evanston, Illinois
- The Art Institute of Chicago, Chicago, Illinois
- Institute for Latino Studies/University of Notre Dame, Indiana
- Art Museum of the Americas, OAS, Washington, D.C.
- El Museo del Barrio, New York City
- DePaul Art Museum, Chicago, Illinois
- Loyola University Museum of Art, Chicago, Illinois
- Museo Nacional Centro de Arte Reina Sofía, Madrid, Spain

Retrospectives of Bernal's work include those at:

- Cameron Art Museum
