= Vishnevsky =

Vishnevsky (Russian: Вишневский, masculine) or Vishnevskaya (Вишневская, feminine) is the Russian surname of the Polish equivalent Wiśniewski and Belarusian equivalent Višnieŭski (Вішнеўскі), see the latter article for other variants of the surname. Notable people with the surname include:

- Aleksandr Leonidovich Vishnevsky (1861–1943), Russian/Soviet actor
- Alexander Alexandrovich Vishnevsky (1906–1975), Soviet physician
- Aleksandr Sergeevič Višnevskij, Soviet and Russian speleologist
- Alexander Vasilyevich Vishnevsky, Soviet physician
- Anatoly Vishnevsky, Russian demographer and sociologist
- Galina Vishnevskaya (1926–2012), Russian opera singer
- Ivan Vishnenskiy (born 1988), Russian hockey player
- Ivan Vishnevsky (1957–1996), Soviet footballer
- Sergey Vishnevsky, Russian painter
- Valentine Vishnevsky (born 1958), Ukrainian economist
- Vikenty Vishnevsky, Polish/Russian astronomer
- Vitaly Vishnevskiy (born 1980), Russian hockey player
- Vladimir Vishnevsky, Russian poet
- Vsevolod Vishnevsky (1900–1951), Russian dramatist
