= Oiling =

Oiling may refer to:

- Oiling (leather processing)
- Applying a drying oil finish to wooden items
- Lubrication of mechanical parts with oil
