= Vishnevsky liniment =

Russian balsamic liniment

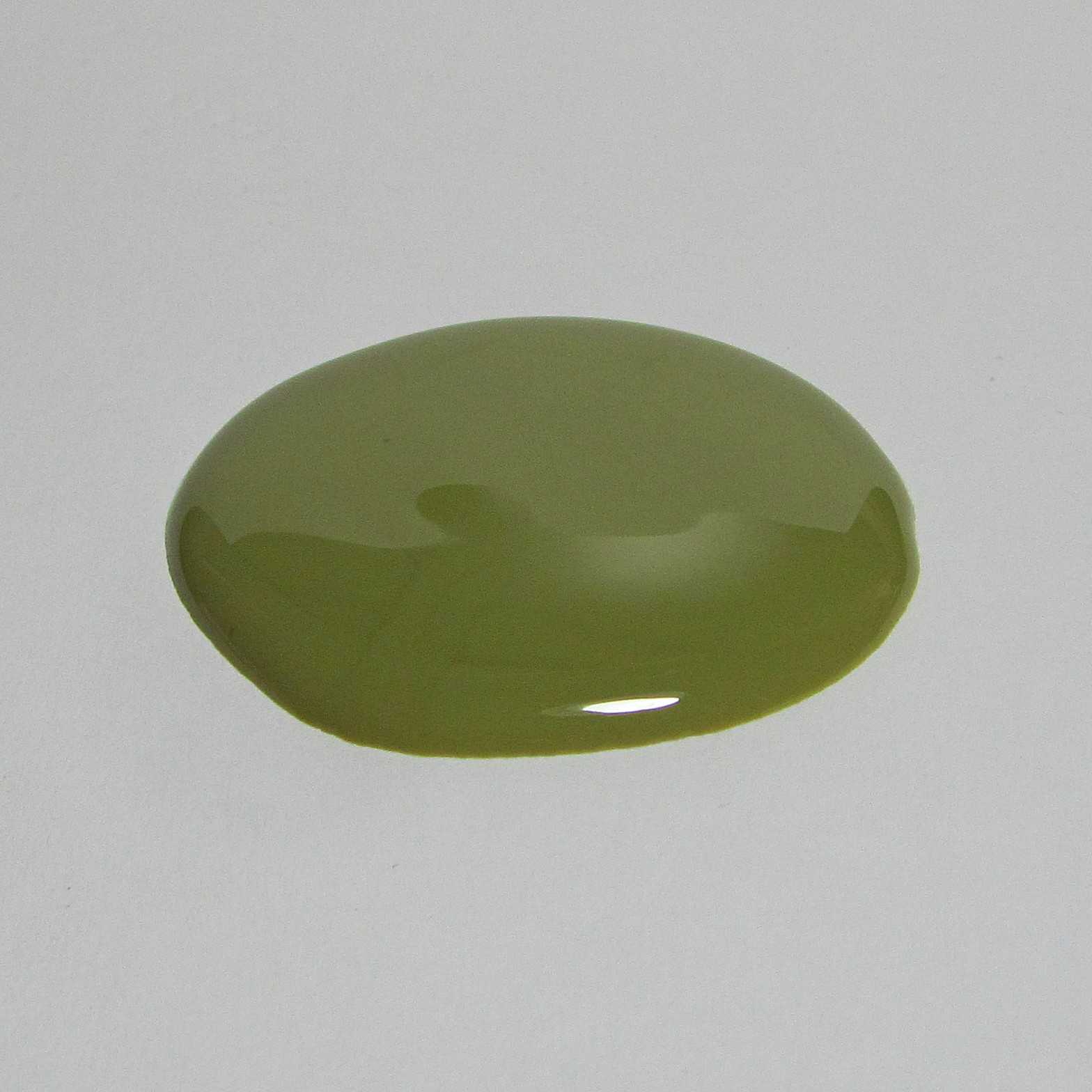
Vishnevsky liniment on paper

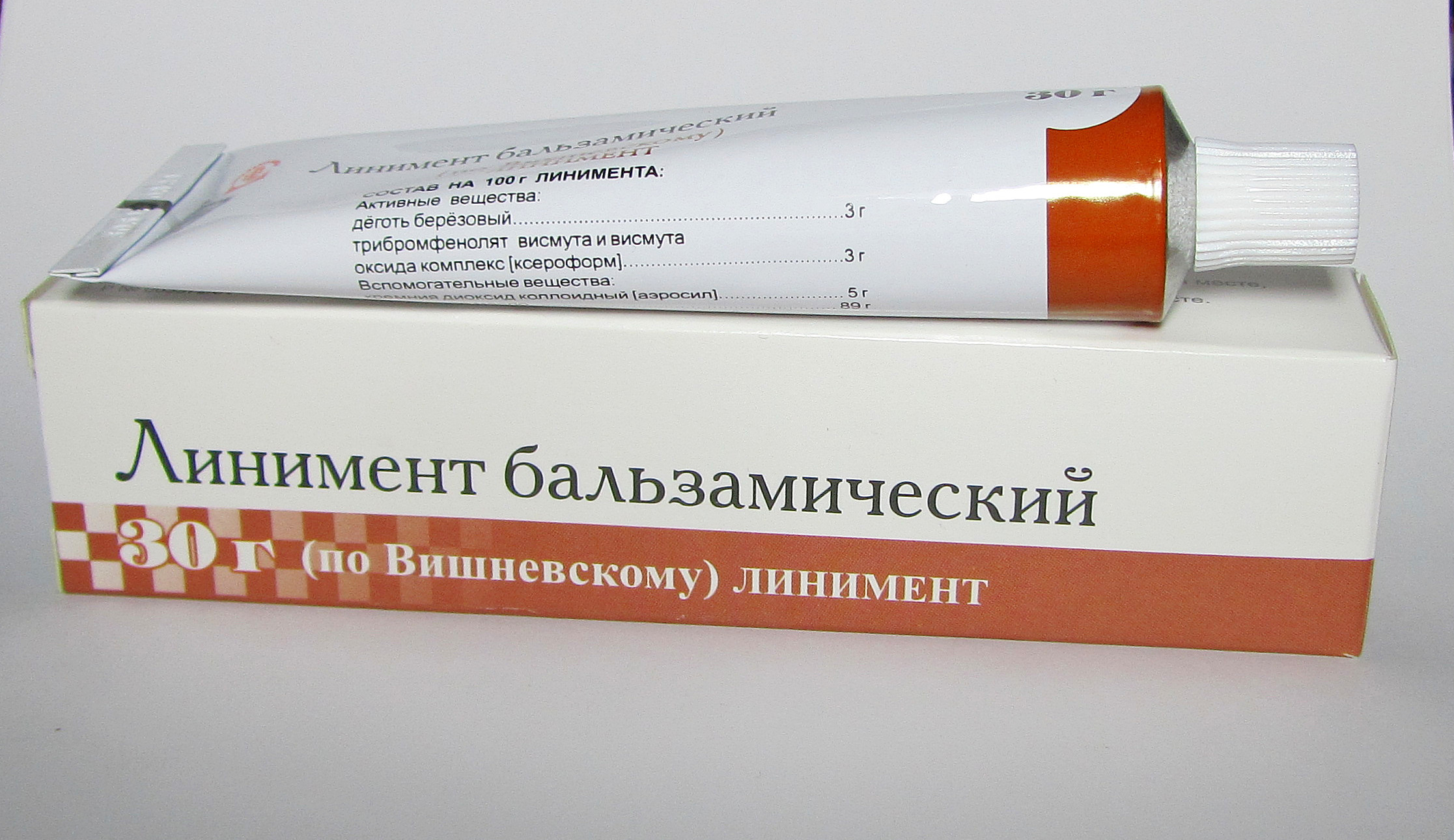
Vishnevsky liniment in a package

Vishnevsky liniment or balsamic liniment (Russian: мазь Вишневского, Latin: Linimentum balsamicum Wishnevsky) is a topical medication which is used to treat wounds, burns, skin ulcers and suppurations. Developed by Russian surgeon Alexander Vishnevsky in 1927, the liniment is available in two variants: one containing birch tar, xeroformium (bismuth tribromophenolate) and castor oil, and another containing Peru balsam instead of birch tar.

It is used as a topical medication across the former Eastern Bloc due to its anti-inflammatory properties.

Vishnevsky liniment was broadly used in the Soviet army during World War II. It was later discussed in medical literature that a prolonged application of the tar-containing version of the liniment for chronic skin ulcers, wounds or burns might be associated with higher risk of skin cancer, hematologic or other malignancy, primarily due to inconsistent tar quality and carcinogenic impurities like benzopyrene.

However, this potential carcinogenicity was not confirmed in animal experiments, and modern formulations have replaced the controversial tar component with Peru balsam for standard clinical safety.

Consequently, this modified, tar-free formulation does not pose a carcinogenic threat, making it safe for the brief treatment of acute localized infections (e.g. paronychia).

== See also ==
- List of Russian drugs
