= Valentine Vishnevsky =

Ukrainian economist (born 1958)

- Born: Valentine Pavlovich Vishnevsky; June 8, 1958 (age 68); Sumy, Ukraine

Academic background
- Education: Kharkov Engineering and Economic Institute

Academic work
- Discipline: Economics
- Institutions: Institute of Industrial Economics of the NAS of Ukraine

Valentine Pavlovich Vishnevsky (born June 8, 1958) is a Ukrainian economist. He is a fellow of the National Academy of Sciences of Ukraine (2012) and professor of economics (2005). The area of his scientific interests includes economic theory, modelling of economic systems, fiscal, monetary and industrial policy.

== Biography ==
Vishnevsky was born on June 8, 1958 in Sumy in Ukraine. In 1980, he graduated with honours from the Kharkov Engineering and Economic Institute (qualification — engineer-economist). Since 1980 he has been an employee of the Institute of Industrial Economics of National Academy of Sciences (NAS) of Ukraine. In 1987, he defended his PhD thesis on "Economic methods of using reserves to accelerate the technical re-equipment of production (case study on metallurgical enterprises of the Ukrainian SSR)", and in 1998 he defended his doctoral thesis on "Methodological bases of improving the taxation of enterprises".

Since 1997, Vishnevsky has been the head of a number of research and scientific projects of the NAS of Ukraine. Among the most important ones is the scientific and technical project on creation of "The Intellectual automated system of budget process support" (2007–2013)”, which is a unique complex of system-dynamic mathematical models, databases and information technologies that allow quantitatively estimate the consequences of decisions made by authorities in the sphere of fiscal policy for the economy of individual regions and the state as a whole.

Vishnevsky is the Editor-in-Chief of the journal Economy of Industry. He is also a member of the editorial boards of the journals Science and Innovations and Economy of Ukraine.

== Publications ==
Based on the research findings more than 100 scientific works were published, including four personal monographs and a number of scientific monographs in co-authorship, papers in well-known Ukrainian, Russian and English-language journals (Economy of Ukraine, Voprosy Ekonomiki, World Economy and International Relations, Terra Economicus, Journal of Tax Reform, Environment, Development and Sustainability, etc.).

=== Selected papers ===
- Vishnevsky, Valentine P.; Chekina, Viktoriia D. (2018). "Robot vs. tax inspector or how the fourth industrial revolution will change the tax system: a review of problems and solutions". Journal of Tax Reform. 4 (1): 6–26. doi:10.15826/jtr.2018.4.1.042. hdl:10995/61852.
- Vishnevsky, Valentine; Aleksandrov, Ivan; Polovyan, Alexey (February 2011). "Scenarios of the old industrial regions' development: selecting the methodology". Environment, Development and Sustainability. 13 (1): 65–78. Bibcode:2011EDSus..13...65V. doi:10.1007/s10668-010-9248-6. S2CID 16793908.
- Vishnevsky, V.; Dementiev, V. (September 20, 2010). "Innovations, Institutions, and Evolution". Voprosy Ekonomiki (9): 41–62. doi:10.32609/0042-8736-2010-9-41-62.
- Vishnevsky, V.; Vetkin, A. (February 20, 2004). "Tax Evasion and Rational Choice of the Taxpayer". Voprosy Ekonomiki (2): 96–108. doi:10.32609/0042-8736-2004-2-96-108.

=== Selected monographs ===
- Vishnevsky, V.; Harkushenko, O.; Kniaziev, S.; Lypnytskyi, D.; Chekina, V. (2020). Digitalization of Ukrainian economy: transformational potential. doi:10.15407/akademperiodyka.398.188. ISBN 9789663603988. S2CID 216428233.
- Vyshnevskyi, V.P.; Vyshnevska, O.M.; Matiushin, O.V; Shelud’ko, N.M. (December 12, 2017). Monetary Power in the Modern World: Who will Challenge Dollar?. doi:10.15407/akademperiodyka.345.200. ISBN 9789663603452.
- Supranational Models of Tax Systems: from China to the Maghreb (Chinese-East Asian, Indian-South Asian, and Maghreb-middle Eastern tax populations) : monograph / V. P. Vishnevsky, L.I. Goncharenko, A.V. Gurnak, E.N. Vishnevskaya; Edited by professor V. P. Vishnevsky. M.: Magistr: INFRA-M, 2017. 272 pp. ISBN 978-5-9776-0453-6 (в пер.) Publication Language: Russian.
- Taxation: Theories, Problems, Solutions / V. P. Vishnevsky, A.S. Vetkin, E.N. Vishnevskaya etc.; Edited by V. P. Vishnevsky. – Donetsk: DonNTU, IEP NAS of Ukraine, 2006. – 504 pp. ISBN 966-377-019-8. Publication Language: Russian.

== Awards and prizes ==
- 1991 — a medal of the NAS of Ukraine with a prize for young scientists (for series of works "Theoretical foundations and methodological support for the formation of an effective mechanism of profit distribution")
- 2019 – the winner of the award named after M. I. Tugan-Baranovsky for outstanding scientific work in the field of economics (for series of works "Prospects, directions and mechanisms of development of the smart industry in Ukraine")

== Bibliography ==
- Personal page on site of the NAS of Ukraine
- 50-річчя члена-кореспондента НАН України Валентина Павловича Вишневського
- eLIBRARY.RU — Вишневский Валентин Павлович — Анализ публикационной активности
- http://ojs.econindustry.org/index.php/ep
