= Russia leather =

Leather curried after tanning with birch oil

Russia leather (Russian: юфть or yuft) is a particular form of bark-tanned cow leather. It is distinguished from other types of leather by a processing step that takes place after tanning, where birch oil is worked into the rear face of the leather. This produces a leather that is hard-wearing, flexible and resistant to water. The oil impregnation also deters insect damage. This leather was a major export good from Russia in the 17th and 18th centuries because of its high quality, its usefulness for a range of purposes, and the difficulty of replicating its manufacture elsewhere. It was an important item of trade for the Muscovy Company. In German-speaking countries, this leather was also known by the name Juchten or Juften.

== Production ==
Producing the leather involved three processes:

- Tanning the leather. This was a bark tanning process, similar to other vegetable-tanned leather.
- Saturating the tanned hide with birch oil. This is the most distinctive part of the process, giving Russia leather its water resistance and distinctive smell.
- Dyeing the leather either red or black. This was not an essential part of the process, but was characteristic.

=== Tanning ===
The tanning process was unexceptional amongst other vegetable tanning processes using tree bark. It followed the usual steps of long soaking and cleaning in water, liming to remove hair, and then the tanning itself.

Tanning steeps the leather in a solution of tanbark for around five weeks, with twice daily agitation and weekly replacement of the 'tan', or tanning solution. A great quantity of tanbark is required, around 2,880 litres for 150 hides. (Note: This is the quantity of bark required to make the tan mixture. The liquid volume is considerably more than this.)

The tanbark used in Russia was sourced from Salix repens. However, in Siberia the more readily available bast (dark inner bark, beneath the papery bark) of the birch tree was used; it was also reported that spruce bark would be equally effective.

=== Oiling ===
The oiling process is what really distinguishes Russia leather from others. Birch oil is applied to the flesh side of the leather, soaking through completely and saturating the leather entirely. Care is taken that it is only applied to one side of the leather, keeping it away from the grain side to avoid discolouration and poor dyeing later. Seal oil is also reported to have been used.

The production of Russia leather is thus a currying or curing process, more than merely tanning.

==== Birch oil ====
Production of 'degot' , the birch oil or birch tar for leathermaking was a specialist craft and practiced by only a few villages that then supplied other leathermaking sites. It was a partial pyrolysis and distillation process, similar to the making of turpentine.

The papery birch bark was peeled from standing trees and collected. Trees were carefully chosen, older trees being favoured. The season for collecting bark was in late June, when there was the most sap. This bark was then pressed flat under weights and left for a week.

Distillation was performed by a process akin to charcoal burning, involving the entire village in a group effort. A large, shallow conical pit was dug, 100 feet (30 m) in diameter and lined with clay. A central drain was constructed, with an underground lined drain leading outwards to a collection pit beyond the burning pit. This drain was protected by a strainer dome to avoid ash entering the tar drain and to separate the burning bark from the flammable tar. The pit was then stacked with carefully arranged layers of birch bark, above an insulating and filtering layer of linden husks. The bark was very carefully stacked, so that there was no air space between layers and so combustion could be controlled. A completed pit might be filled ten or twenty feet high (3–6 m). An airtight cover of earth, animal dung and damp fireproof material was placed over the pit, in the manner of a charcoal clamp. A fire of straw was then lit in the centre, spreading slowly outwards into the birch bark.

Most of the bark burners would then watch the burn proceeding, carefully sealing air leaks in any areas that were burning too fast. The tar ran down through the bark, filtered through the linden and then through the clay drain and into the collection pit. Others would ladle the collected tar from the pit and into barrels. A burn could go on for ten days continuously, day and night. A quantity of five hundred 'fuhren' of birch bark could give three thousand buckets of tar.

A smaller-scale process was also carried out by some individuals using a kettle-like clay pot a couple of feet high.

It was considered, even into the nineteenth century, that although the manufacture of 'Russia leather' could be successfully undertaken in the rest of Europe, production of the necessary birch oil would still require import from Russia or Poland. It was likely that other tree species could be found that would produce an oil with similar preservative properties, but the distinctive aroma of genuine Russia leather would require the traditional birch.

Cedar oil (a potent bacteriocide) is still used today as a similar preservative ingredient in leather treatments applied to finished leathergoods, such as an ingredient in British Museum leather dressing.

=== Dyeing ===
Before dyeing, the leather was softened by soaking with alum water and mechanical working.

In later years, Russia leather was tooled to give a decorative surface texture. This was done by rolling it with a grooved brass roller, usually twice in slightly different directions to give a cross-hatched effect.

The usual colour of dyeing was red and this was performed with an alkaline liquor made by boiling chips of a dye wood, 'fernambuk'. This is described as red sandalwood (Santalum sp.), but by the dark colour resulting in the leather has also been identified as logwood. (Note: The use of logwood is unlikely for dyeing here, for two reasons. First, logwood gives a deep red, but only in acidic solutions. In an alkaline dye bath, logwood gives a blue colour. The dyeing process for Russia leather was based on lime, i.e., strongly alkaline. Second, sandalwood is produced across the Indian subcontinent, with trade routes into Russia via Afghanistan. Logwood is a New World species of Central America.)

A black leather was also produced, although in smaller quantity. This was considered a coarser, more utilitarian product and was usually applied to the horsehide Russia leather also produced for weatherproof exterior equipment such as horse harnesses. Two forms of dye were used, both based on black iron tannates produced by reaction of iron salts with residual tannin in the leather. A similar colour is found in iron gall ink. The first dye used the normal fernambuk dye, with the addition of iron(II) sulfate or green vitriol. This dye turned black immediately, reacting with tannin in the red dyewood.

The second, cheaper, black dye was produced by scrap iron dissolving into an acidic liquor, usually stale kvass (quas at that time), the ubiquitous Russian ryebread beer. This dye has no distinct colour to begin with but relies on reaction with the tannins of the leather. This cheaper dye is also fugitive and fades in time to a rust-red colour.

=== Secrecy of its manufacture ===
Although its manufacture does not appear to have been preserved as a secret, it was a process that could not be replicated outside Russia, despite attempts. Production gradually moved to other countries during the 19th century. In 1807, von Meidinger, who worked for an early Russia leather factory in Vienna, learned details of the process from a Russian tanner and described it. His view was that this process, once known and understood, could be replicated in Germany.

In 1874, Marshall Jewell, U.S. Minister to Russia, who was also a currier by trade, discovered the recipe and published it openly in the USA, rather than profiting personally by it.

== Uses ==
=== Chairs ===
Upholstered chairs first began to become common in the 17th century, in the later period of the Age of Oak. These used expensive fabrics as a covering, costing far more than the wooden frame of the chair. Other, cheaper, chairs were extensively carved in wood – any sort of chair, rather than a stool, was a luxury item. Leather, and Russia leather, was also used as an upholstery material. The use of Russia leather in particular was encouraged by the English Civil War and the Puritan styles it encouraged. Plain leather upholstery, even though an expensive item, was seen as less ostentatious and so more acceptable than either fabric or carving.

Leather was applied to simple backstools, a chair with vertical rear posts and simple crosswise rails. These would be a commonplace chair today, but at the time it was more usual for chairs to have a solid wooden back. The leather was stretched across between the rails and nailed into place with large headed brass nails. Such undecorated chairs are a characteristic furniture style of the Interregnum period. Only Russia leather was flexible enough to be used in this way. Inferior leathers, when used, would crack across the edges of the frame. A better technique with such leathers was to support the leather from beneath with interwoven strips of canvas webbing. The odour of birch oil was recognised in the completed chairs and considered as a mark of quality. Russia leather chairs have been remarkably hard-wearing and examples have lasted in use into the 19th century, without re-covering. When finally worn out, this was often by the surface of the leather having worn right through into a hole, still without any structural cracking of the leather, as a less flexible hide would fail.

=== Footwear ===
Russia leather was (and still is) commonly used for production of footwear. In Russia itself, it was usually used to make high boots (sapogi). In this craft, Russia leather was usually divided into two sorts: the more expensive yalovka (produced from calf skin) and the cheaper yuft (from all other kinds of animal skins). In Soviet times, yalovka leather was used to make army officers' field "Chrome" boots (Note: i.e. cheap chrome-tanned leather, albeit made from an animal hide.), and yuft leather, in combination with an artificial leather substitute called kirza, was used for the enlisted men's boots. Only high-ranking officers or the nomenklatura would have access to boots made from the quality of true Russia leather.

== Perfume ==
The distinctive birch oil aroma, and its connotations of high quality, led to its use as a deliberate fragrance.

- Coco Chanel's Cuir de Russie perfume, from 1927.
- Cussons' Imperial Leather soap, from 1938
- The French perfume company, Parfums Regence, produces the male fragrance, Kölnisch Juchten
