= Peau d'Espagne =

Perfume made of flower and spice oils

Peau d'Espagne (pronounced [po dɛspaɲ]; "skin of Spain") is a perfume made of flower and spice oils. Traditionally employed to scent leather, it is also used as a perfume for women and to flavor dishes.

== Scent ==
British sexologist Havelock Ellis esteemed peau d'espagne as "a highly complex and luxurious perfume, often the favorite scent of sensuous persons" and noted that "it is said by some, probably with a certain degree of truth, that Peau d'Espagne is of all perfumes that which most nearly approaches the odor of a woman's skin; whether it also suggests the odor of leather is not so clear".

== Use ==
As first employed in the sixteenth century, peau d'espagne was composed primarily of rose, neroli, sandalwood, lavender, verbena, bergamot, clove and cinnamon oil, as well as civet and musk. Leather steeped in it was also used to perfume stationery and clothing.

Since 1910, with the addition of vanilla, tonka, styrax, and geranium, peau d'espagne is also employed as a perfume for women. According to perfumer Mandy Aftel, it has "lost none of its sensuous appeal over the decades" and is an exception to the "generally tame and uninspired" floral blends of the turn of the 19th century.

In cooking, peau d'espagne can be used to flavor meat dishes or beverages to impart an exotic aroma.

== Composition ==
The 1872 Encyclopedia Of Practical Receipts And Processes by William B. Dick describes the composition and production of peau d’Espagne as follows:

Peau d'Espagne, or Spanish Skin, is merely highly-perfumed leather. Take of oil of rose, neroli, and santal [sandalwood], each 1/2 ounce; oil of lavender, verbena, bergamot, each 1/4 ounce; oil of cloves and cinnamon, each 2 drachms; in this dissolve 2 ounces gum benzoin. In this steep good pieces of waste leather for a day or two, and dry it over a line. Prepare a paste by rubbing in a mortar, 1 drachm of civet with 1 drachm of grain musk, and enough gum-tragacanth mucilage to give a proper consistence. The leather is cut up into pieces about 4 inches square; two of these are pasted together with the above paste, placed between 2 pieces of paper, weighted or pressed until dry. It may then be inclosed in silk or satin. It gives off its odor for years; is much used for perfuming paper, envelopes, etc.; for which purpose 1 or 2 pieces of the perfumed leather, kept in the drawer or desk containing the paper, will impart to it a fine and durable perfume.

== In culture ==
The scent gave its name to a 1933 comedy in four acts by the French writer Jean Sarment.

The British poet Arthur Symons published a poem titled Peau d'Espagne in his 1913 collection Knave of Hearts. It concludes:

Peau d'Espagne, scent of sex, that brings
To mind those ways wherein I went,
Perhaps I might forget these things
But for that infamy, your scent!
