= Alexander Vasilyevich Vishnevsky =

Russian and Soviet surgeon (1877–1948)

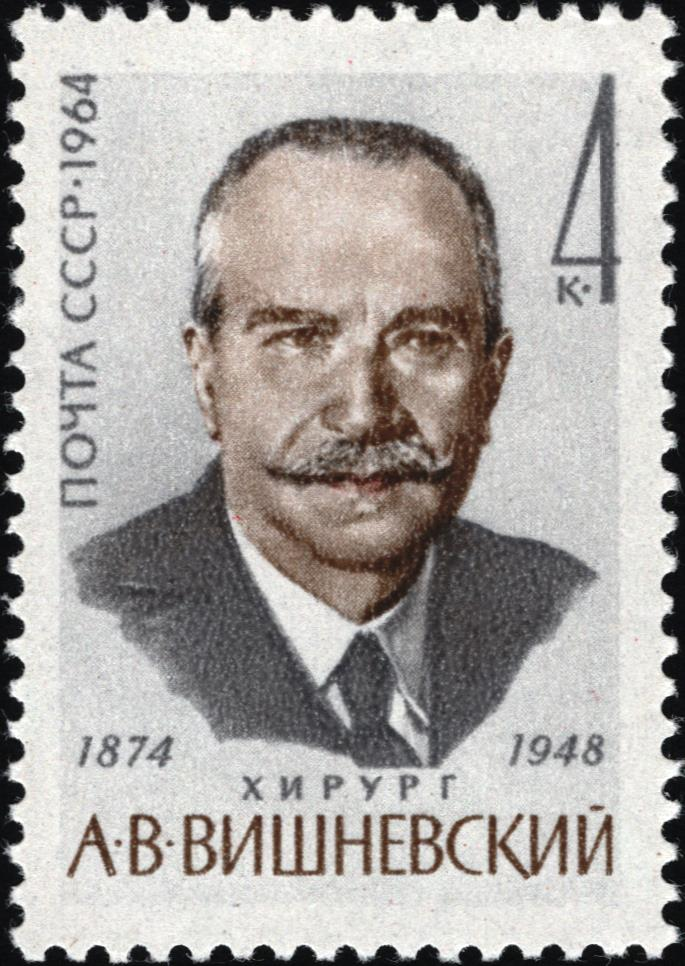
- Soviet commemorative stamp featuring A. V. Vishnevsky
- Born: September 4 [O.S. August 23] 1874; Nizhny Chiryurt, Dagestan Oblast, Russian Empire
- Died: 13 November 1948 (aged 74); Moscow, Soviet Union
- Education: Imperial Kazan University
- Occupation: Surgeon
- Known for: Vishnevsky liniment
- Medical career
- Institutions: Kazan State University; USSR Academy of Medical Sciences

Alexander Vasilyevich Vishnevsky (Russian: Алекса́ндр Васи́льевич Вишне́вский; 4 September 1874 – 13 November 1948) was a Russian and Soviet surgeon known for developing the topical medication of balsamic liniment.

== Early life ==
Alexander Vasilyevich Vishnevsky was born in to the family of a staff captain in the Imperial Russian Army. In 1899 he graduated from the Medical Faculty of the Imperial Kazan University.

== Career ==
During the First World War, Vishnevsky led two surgical courses and at the same time was the senior physician of the hospital of the Kazan department of the All-Russian Zemstvo Union, a consulting physician of the hospitals of the Kazan Exchange and Merchant Society, and the infirmary of the Kazan Military District.

He worked at Kazan University and the Alexandrovsky Hospital in Kazan until 1934. In the meantime, he completed several stays abroad (mainly in Germany and France) during which he studied methods of urological research, treatment of the genitourinary system and brain surgery. Observing the effects of novocaine on the course of pathological processes, he came to the conclusion that it acts not only as an anesthetic, but also has a positive effect on the course of the inflammatory process and on wound healing. He developed a scientific concept of the influence of the nervous system on the inflammatory process. On this basis, he created new methods of treating inflammatory processes, purulent wounds and traumatic shock. The combination of novocaine and oil-balsam dressing he invented provided a new method of treating inflammatory processes in spontaneous gangrene of the lower extremities, trophic ulcers, thrombophlebitis, abscesses, carbuncles and other diseases.

At the end of 1934 he moved to Moscow, where he headed the surgical clinic of the Central Institute for Advanced Medical Studies. When he left Kazan, he left many of his students there. Three of the four surgical departments of the Kazan State Medical Institute were headed by his students. Another five students headed surgical departments in other cities. One of his best students was his son Alexander Alexandrovich, who became a military surgeon. In the autumn of 1941 he returned to Kazan, where the surgical clinic of the All-Union Institute of Experimental Medicine had been evacuated. Vishnevsky's new method of pain relief and wound healing, developed and proposed by him in 1927 played a huge role in World War II, saving thousands of Soviet soldiers. Vishnevsky anesthesia became one of the leading methods of Soviet surgeons. This method, accessible even to ordinary surgeons, facilitated the penetration of surgical interventions into ordinary medical facilities. The oil-balsam liniment is still used in the treatment of wounds to this day.

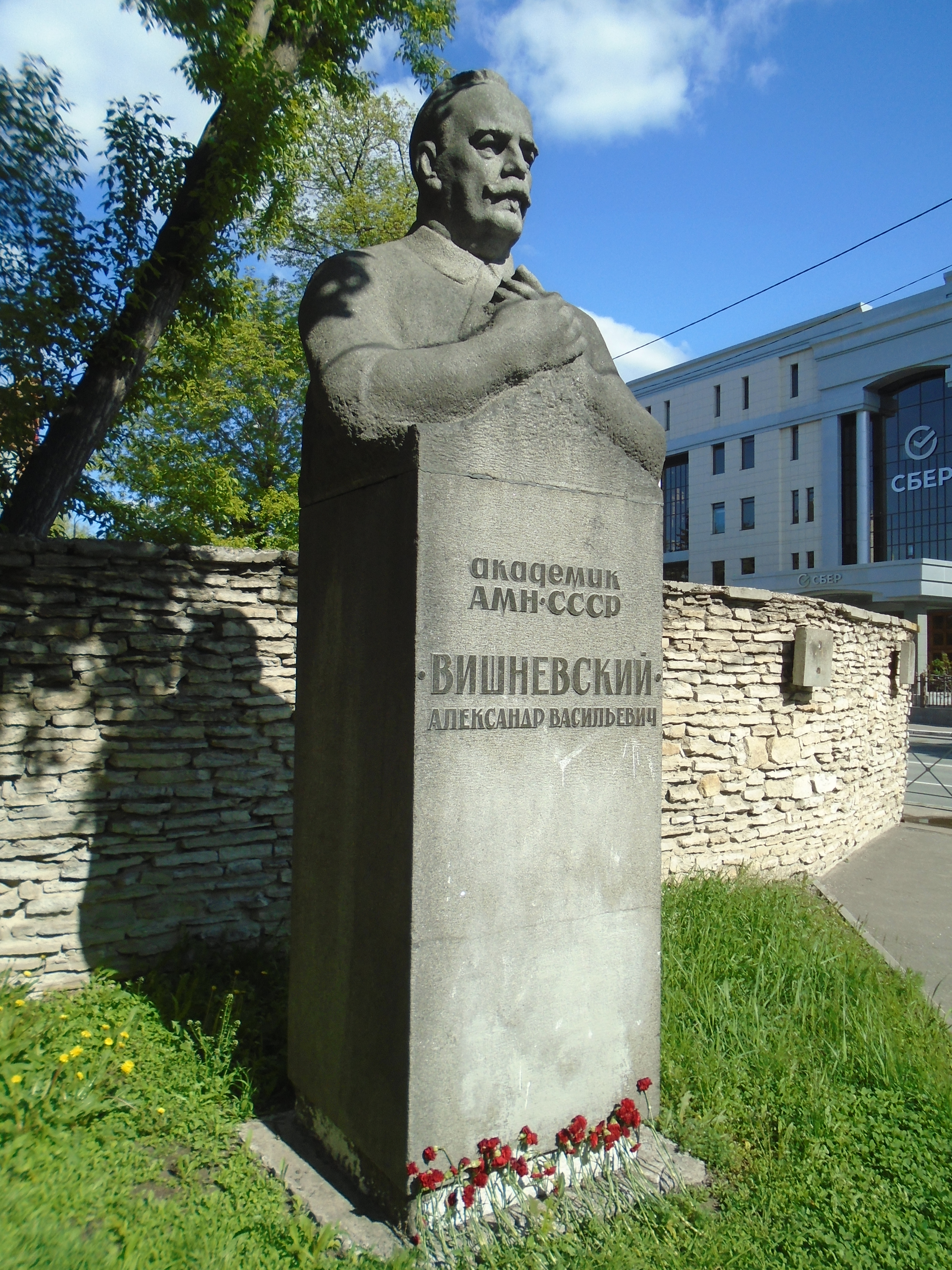
Bust of Alexander Vishnevsky in Kazan

In December 1947 he was elected a full member of the Academy of Medical Sciences of the USSR.

== Death ==
In 1947 the Institute of Experimental and Clinical Surgery was established in Moscow, of which he was director until his death on November 12, 1948. He was buried at the Novodevichy Cemetery in Moscow.
