= Michal Wisniowski =

Polish artist

- Born: Michał Wojciech Wiśniowski; September 30, 1980 (age 45); Wrocław, Poland

Michał Wojciech Wiśniowski (born September 30, 1980 in Wrocław, Poland), known as Michal Wisniowski, is a contemporary artist who works in both fine arts media, such as painting, as well as digital and commercial media.

== Life and career ==
Michal Wisniowski was born in communist Poland, from where his family fled to Western Europe seeking political asylum and eventually settling in West Germany. In 1995 Wisniowski emigrated again, from (Germany) to the US.

He studied fine art and philosophy at Rocky Mountain College, and after receiving his Bachelor of Fine Arts in 2003 moved to North Carolina. During his time on the East Coast Wisniowski began his career as an emerging artist in the contemporary pop art genre.

In 2007 he founded Aniwave, the first and only anime film festival on the North Carolina coast, a direct result of his interest in otaku sub-culture. In 2009, Michal Wisniowski debuted a solo exhibition under the title "[ peripheral / interface ]" which met with attention from local press as "a sure-footed step forward."

== Books ==
- "Paintings" Lulu Press (2007); ASIN: B002ACQSBG
