= Vyšniauskas =

Vyšniauskas is a Lithuanian surname, a Lithuanized form of the Polish surname Wiśniewski, see the latter article for other forms of the surname.

Notable people with the surname include:

- Bronius Vyšniauskas (1923–2015), Lithuanian sculptor
- Ovidijus Vyšniauskas (born 1957), Lithuanian musician
- Ramūnas Vyšniauskas (born 1976), Lithuanian weightlifter
- Vidmantas Vyšniauskas (born 1969), Lithuanian footballer
