= Currier =

Person who dresses and colors tanned leather

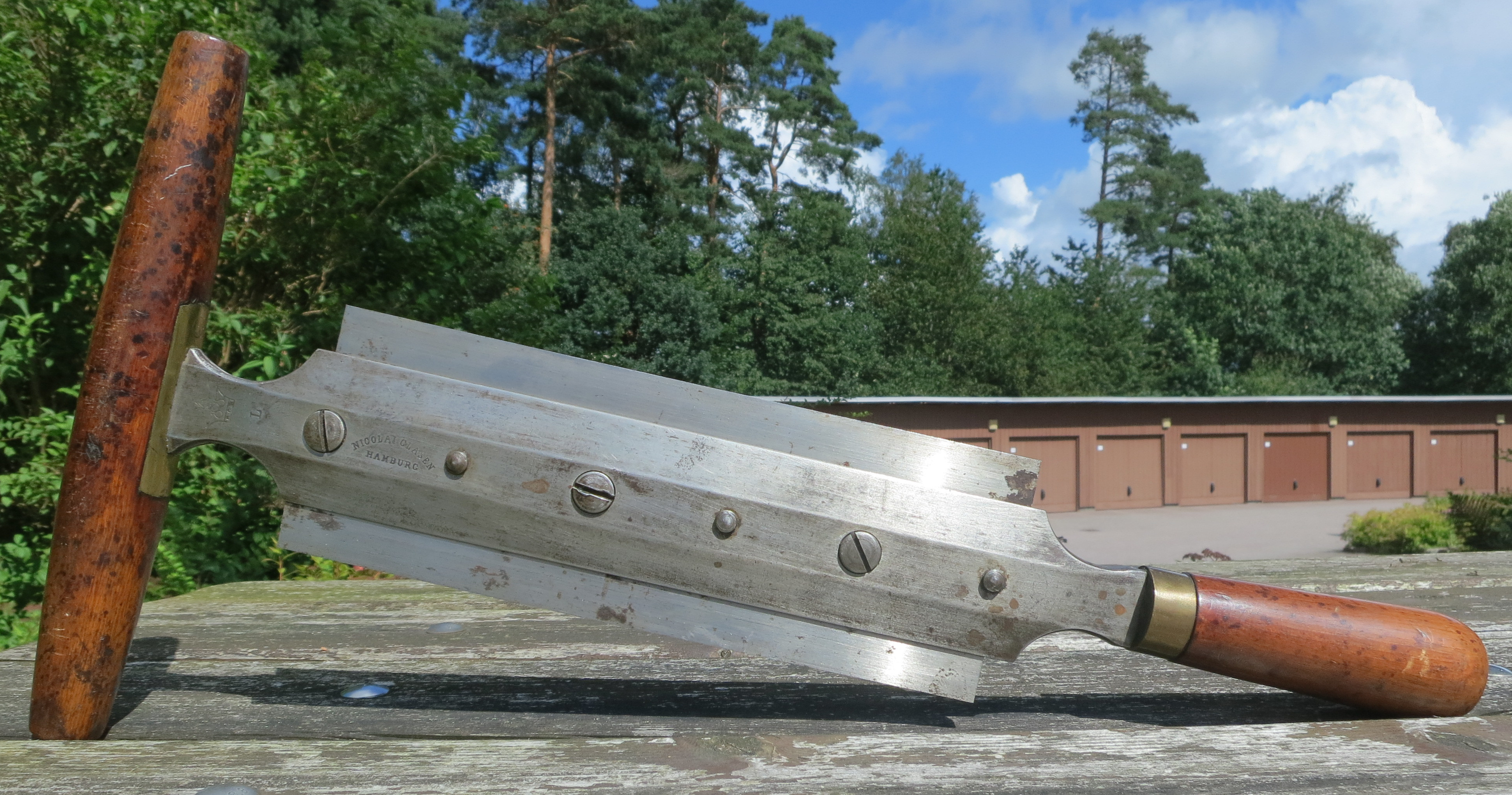
Early 20th century currier's knife manufactured by Nicolai Clasen, Hamburg, Germany.

A currier is a specialist in the leather-processing trade. After the tanning process, the currier applies techniques of dressing, finishing and colouring to a tanned hide to make it strong, flexible and waterproof. The leather is stretched and burnished to produce a uniform thickness and suppleness, and dyeing and other chemical finishes give the leather its desired colour.

After currying, the leather is then ready to pass to the fashioning trades such as saddlery, bridlery, shoemaking or glovemaking.

== See also ==
- Russia leather, a historically important oiled leather, curried with a birch oil that gave it a distinctive scent.
