= Nizhny Chiryurt =

Nizhny Chiryurt Нижний Чирюрт Гъокь Гелбахъ
- Selo
- Location within Republic of Dagestan Location within Russia
- Coordinates: 43°10′N 46°51′E
- Country: Russia
- Region: Republic of Dagestan
- District: Kizilyurtovsky District
- Time zone: UTC+3:00

Nizhny Chiryurt (Russian: Нижний Чирюрт; Avar: Гъокь Гелбахъ) is a rural locality (a selo) in Kizilyurtovsky District, Republic of Dagestan, Russia. The population was 1,509 as of 2010. There are 58 streets.

== Geography ==
Nizhny Chiryurt is located 6 km south of Kizilyurt (the district's administrative centre) by road, on the Sulak River. Stary Bavtugay and Bavtugay are the nearest rural localities.

== Nationalities ==
Avars live there.
