= Krzysztof Wiśniowski =

Polish architect (born 1944)

Krzysztof Wiśniowski (born 1944) is a Polish architect, who lived and worked in Kuwait. Notable projects include the Port Authority Headquarters, Kuwait.

== Early life and education ==
Wiśniowski was born in Ustroń, Poland and studied architecture at the Wrocław University of Science and Technology from 1962 to 1968.

== Early career ==
In 1969, Wiśniowski together with Mieczysław Sowa and Ryszard Żabiński won the 1st prize of the C.Z.S.B.M competition for the city housing estate - pl:Śródmiejska Dzielnica Mieszkaniowa w Łodzi - in Łódź, Poland, a flagship project of the regime of Edward Gierek. In 1974 with Andrzej Bohdanowicz, Ryszard Daczkowski and Edward Lach he again won the C.Z.S.B.M competition for the housing estate Kozanów, Wrocław. Wiśniowski began his international career in 1977, when he was employed by the office of Shiber Consult, headed by Victor Shiber, Kuwait. One of his first projects with Shiber Consult was the design for the Library in Damascus, Syria. Working with Shiber Consult in cooperation with the Industrial and Engineering Consulting Office (INCO), Kuwait, Wiśniowski and Bohdanowicz won two significant international competitions: the first was the National Housing Authority competition for the Sabah al Salem housing project in 1977; the second, the National Theatre, Kuwait in 1978. Realised in 1982, the Sabah al Salem development was an important project of its type, providing housing to low income workers, while attempting to remain sensitive to local, cultural and religious customs.

== Later career ==
Wiśniowski moved to Kuwait in 1980, where he was employed by INCO as a principal designer. Together with Andrzej Bohdanowicz he won the international competition for the Port Complex in Kuwait. The complex comprised the Port Authority Headquarters with a 3000 vehicle car park, administration and custom offices, import and export departments, various agencies and banks, the Marine Museum and Library. The project was completed in 1992. With Andrzej Bohdanowicz and Jan Urbanowicz he designed the Al-Baloush Bus Station for the Kuwait Public Transport Company in 1986, completed in 1988. The work Krzysztof Wiśniowski did between 1979 and 1990 features in the well-reviewed book, Architecture in Global Socialism, where Łukasz Stanek discusses the distinct approach of Polish and Eastern European architects working in the Gulf states. Notable is Wisniowski's rethinking of modernist design, by adapting urbanism to contextual forms. Already visible in his earlier Polish-based projects, this exploration of contextual urbanities allowed him to respond to the demand for reflecting Arab and Islamic cultures and traditions in his architecture design work.

Wiśniowski's last major project with INCO was designing and supervising the Ministry of Interior (MOI) headquarters commissioned by the Ministry of Public Works in Kuwait. Other international projects include the 1994–1996 Kuwait Embassy complex in Beijing, China and the 1996 Kuwait Consulate General in Dubai, 1st prize winner of the M.O.F.A competition, Kuwait. In 1997, Krzysztof Wiśniowski redesigned the catholic cathedral compound in Kuwait, described as 'the main attraction' of the migrant Philipindia area of Jibla. His postmodern design reflects on foreign tradition and the symbolic elements it embodies, while accommodating Kuwait laws and customs. In 2005 he moved offices to become director at Soor Engineering Bureau, where he designed more commercial projects, including The Cliffs Residential Complex, Salmiya, The Clover Center, Jabriya, the February 25 & 26 Towers, Sharq and Wafra Tower, Salmiya.

== Exhibitions and Events ==
- Architecture in Global Socialism: Eastern Europe, West Africa and the Middle East in the Cold War, Łukasz Stanek's Book Launch, Museum of Modern Art, Warsaw, 2020.
- Krzysztof Wiśniowski, Anna Wiśniowska, Magdalena Wiśniowska, Jan Wiśniowski, 1969–2006, Museum of Architecture in Wrocław, 2006.
