= Wiśniowa =

Wiśniowa may refer to the following places in Poland:

- Wiśniowa, Lower Silesian Voivodeship (south-west Poland)
- Wiśniowa, Lesser Poland Voivodeship (south Poland)
- Wiśniowa, Kielce County in Świętokrzyskie Voivodeship (south-central Poland)
- Wiśniowa, Ropczyce-Sędziszów County in Subcarpathian Voivodeship (south-east Poland)
- Wiśniowa, Staszów County in Świętokrzyskie Voivodeship (south-central Poland)
- Wiśniowa, Strzyżów County in Subcarpathian Voivodeship (south-east Poland)
