= Wiśniewo =

Wiśniewo may refer to the following places:

- Wiśniewo, Łódź Voivodeship (central Poland)
- Wiśniewo, Ciechanów County in Masovian Voivodeship (east-central Poland)
- Wiśniewo, Podlaskie Voivodeship (north-east Poland)
- Wiśniewo, Mława County in Masovian Voivodeship (east-central Poland)
- Wiśniewo, Ostrołęka County in Masovian Voivodeship (east-central Poland)
- Wiśniewo, Gmina Ostrów Mazowiecka, Ostrów County in Masovian Voivodeship (east-central Poland)
- Wiśniewo, Greater Poland Voivodeship (west-central Poland)
- Wiśniewo, Elbląg County in Warmian-Masurian Voivodeship (north Poland)
- Wiśniewo, Iława County in Warmian-Masurian Voivodeship (north Poland)
- Wiśniewo, West Pomeranian Voivodeship (north-west Poland)
