= Alexander Alexandrovich Vishnevsky =

Soviet surgeon (1906–1975)

- Born: 24 May [O.S. 11 May] 1906; Kazan, Russian Empire
- Died: 19 December 1975 (aged 69); Moscow, USSR
- Occupation: Surgeon
- Known for: First conducted a cardiac surgery under the local anesthesia
- Relatives: Alexandr Vasilyevich Vishnevsky
- Medical career
- Notable works: Created new methods for treating gunshot wounds
- Awards: Hero of Socialist Labor

Alexander Alexandrovich Vishnevsky (Russian: Алекса́ндр Алекса́ндрович Вишне́вский; 24 May [O.S. 11 May] 1906 – 19 December 1975) was a Soviet surgeon, member of the Academy of Medical Sciences of the USSR (1953), honoured worker of science of the RSFSR (1956), Colonel General of Medical Corps (1966), and a Hero of Socialist Labor (1966). Vishnevsky first conducted a cardiac surgery under the local anesthesia (1953).

A son of Alexander Vasilyevich Vishnevsky, he elaborated the new methods for treating gunshot wounds treatment on the Eastern Front of World War II, such as using leeches to remove shrapnel. Later he was awarded several Soviet and foreign awards and prizes.

== Works ==
- Selected works on surgery and adjacent branches, vol. 1–2 (Избранные работы по хирургии и пограничным областям. Т. 1–2. М., 1970)
- Surgeon's Diary. The Great Patriotic War 1941–1945, 2nd ed. (Дневник хирурга. Великая Отечественная война 1941–1945 гг. Изд. 2-е. М., 1970)
