= Oiling (leather processing) =

Oiling is a process whereby leather is hand coated (usually by brush or tampon) with either a raw (un-emulsified) oil or a combination of raw oil, blended with emulsified oils and a penetrating aid. Hand oils can include fragrant oils that help with the smell associated with the leather, e.g., pine oil. Hand oils commonly consist of sulfated vegetable oils, e.g. sulfated castor oil.

Oiling provides the leather with lubrication to increase their softness allowing it to flex repeatedly without cracking. Leather fibres that are dry and un-lubricated break very easily. Oiling does impart colour and an element of water resistance. Oiling would normally be performed on full grain aniline leathers. The most common type of leather oiled is vegetable tanned leather.

== See also ==
- Currying
- Russia leather, a historically important oiled leather, curried with a birch oil that gave it a distinctive scent.
