= Cameron Art Museum =

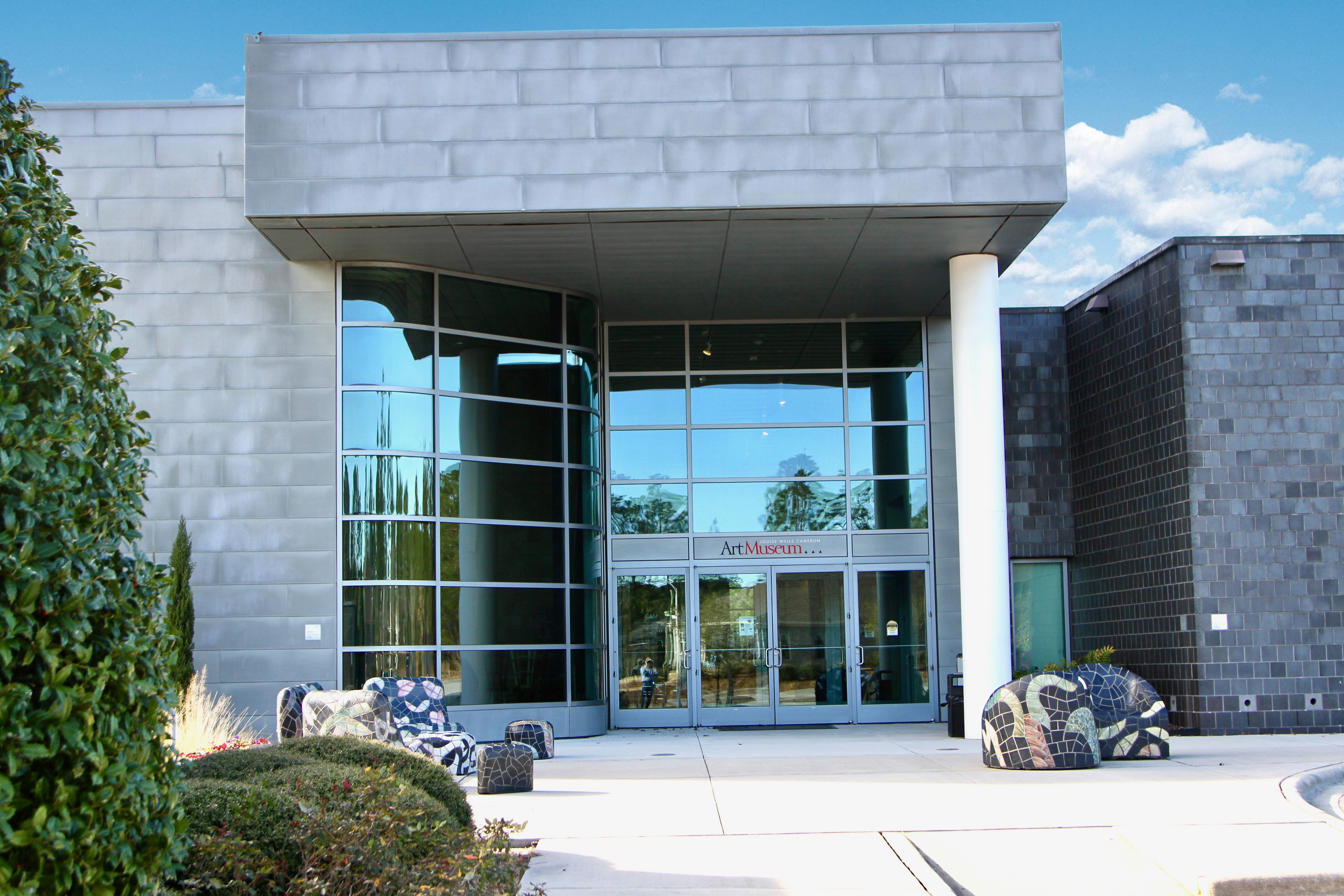
- Main entrance

- Location in North Carolina Location in United States
- Former name: St. John’s Museum of Art
- Established: 1962
- Location: 3201 South 17th Street; Wilmington, North Carolina
- Coordinates: 34.1840°N 77.9153°W
- Type: Art museum
- Director: Heather Wilson
- Architect: Charles Gwathmey
- Website: www.cameronartmuseum.org

The Cameron Art Museum, formerly known as St. John's Museum of Art, was established in 1962 in downtown Wilmington, North Carolina in the 1804 Masonic Lodge building. The museum operated successfully in the downtown area for forty years and, eventually, outgrew its space. In 2001, the museum was relocated to the intersection of Independence and 17th Streets, changing its name to the Cameron Art Museum. The museum's new facilities allowed for the construction of three exhibition areas along with a lecture and reception hall. In addition, it provided space for outdoor exhibits, a clay studio, and an arts education center.

== History of the current museum ==
Louise Wells Cameron was a volunteer at the original museum for 35 years and her husband, Bruce B. Cameron, had served on the museum board of directors. In 1999, the Bruce B. Cameron Foundation initiated the endowment campaign for a new museum with a $4,000,000 donation, and the children of the Camerons donated the land that the museum now sits on. The board of directors voted to name the new museum after Louise Wells Cameron.

== Exhibitions ==
The Cameron Art Museum offers rotating exhibitions of historical and contemporary significance. The museum's permanent collection is composed of work by international, national, and local artists and covers a variety of disciplines.

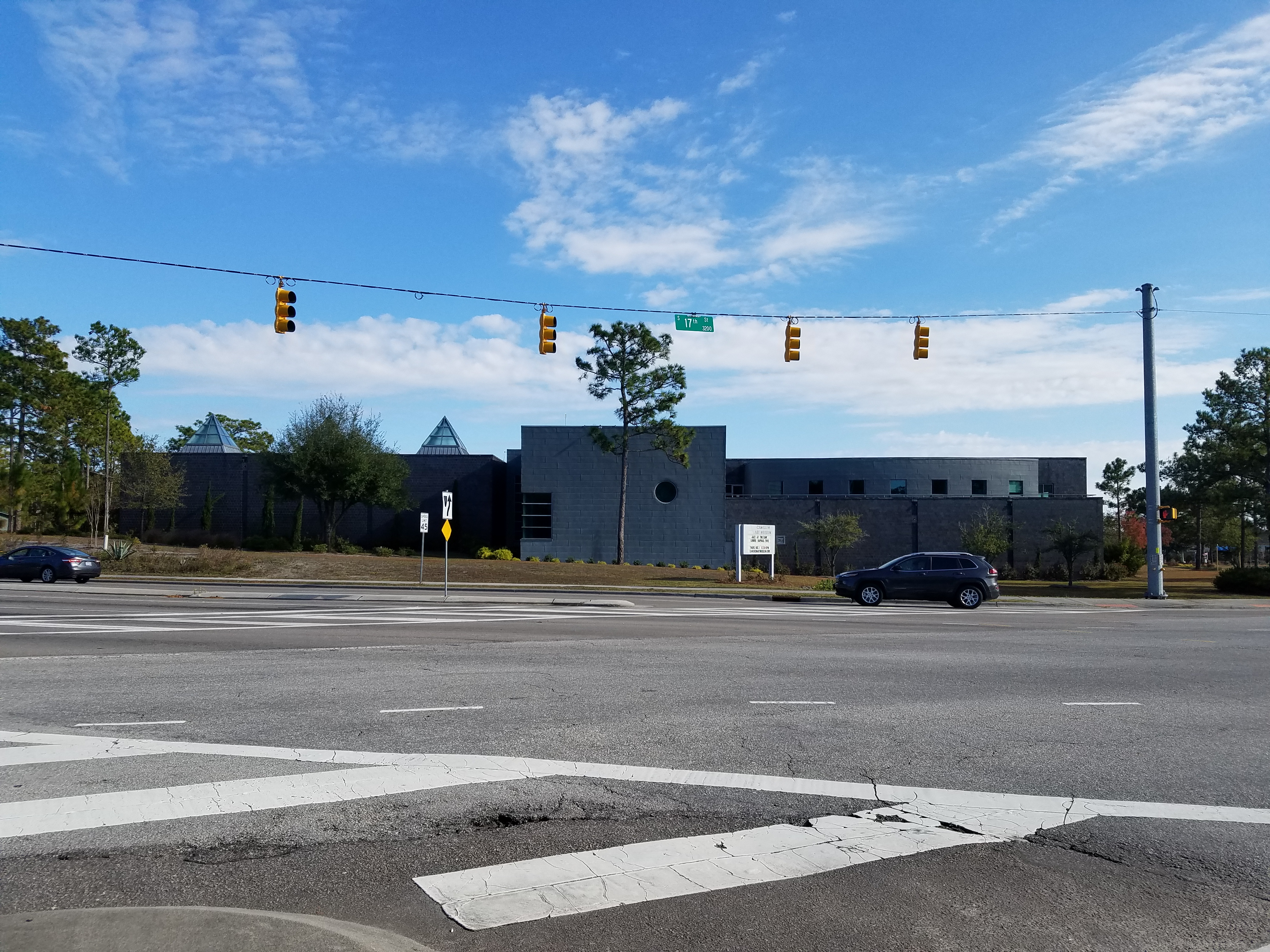

== Civil War battle site and monument ==
The Cameron Art Museum's new location on Independence Street is home to the Civil War site of the Battle of Forks Road fought on February 20, 1865. The Confederate loss at the Battle of Forks Road, directly following the fall of Fort Fisher, marked the beginning of the end for the Confederacy. The loss at Forks Road placed the Cape Fear Port in the hands of the Union, cutting off supply lines to General Robert E. Lee in Northern Virginia and leading to the final surrender of the Confederate Army. The museum grounds are lined with Confederate revetments built during the Battle of Forks Road, and every year the museum commemorates the lives lost on its property with a re-enactment of the battle followed by lectures, workshops, and artillery demonstrations.

In 2018, the Cameron Art Museum was awarded an Inclusive Public Art Grant from the Z. Smith Reynolds Foundation to build a public monument recognizing the legacy of the United States Colored Troops (USCT), who fought for the Union at the Battle of Forks Road. Durham-based artist Stephen Hayes was selected to design and produce the bronze monument, which he titled "Boundless." The monument depicts 11 life-size marching troops, including a standard-bearer and a drummer. Civil War reenactors and descendants of the soldiers who fought in the Battle of Forks Road served as models for the hands and faces featured in the monument. "Boundless" was completed and dedicated in November 2021.

== School ==
The Museum School at the Cameron Art Museum offers a range of beginning and master classes, for children and adults, some of which can include CEU credit through New Hanover County Schools. Students of the Museum School have instructor-guided access to the museum's exhibitions and select objects in the museum's permanent collection not on view, as well as access to the museum's non-circulating art library which has over 2000 publications and monographs. Additionally, the School creates employment opportunities for area artists and instructors.
