= Wiśniew, Mińsk County =

Wiśniew
- Village
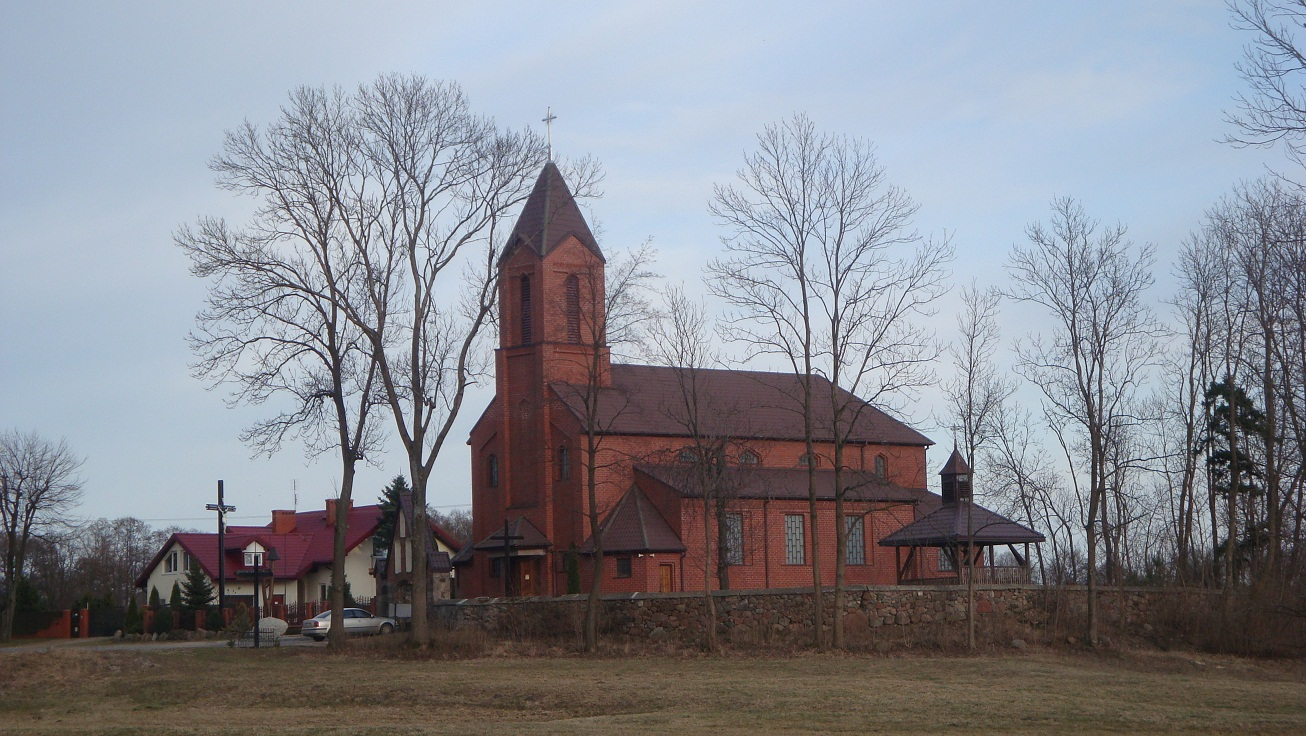
- Holy Trinity Church

- Location within Poland
- Coordinates: 52°15′21″N 21°43′10″E
- Country: Poland
- Voivodeship: Masovian
- County: Mińsk
- Gmina: Jakubów
- Population: 456

Wiśniew [ˈviɕɲɛf] is a village in the administrative district of Gmina Jakubów, within Mińsk County, Masovian Voivodeship, in east-central Poland.
