= Wiśniowiecki =

Polish princely family

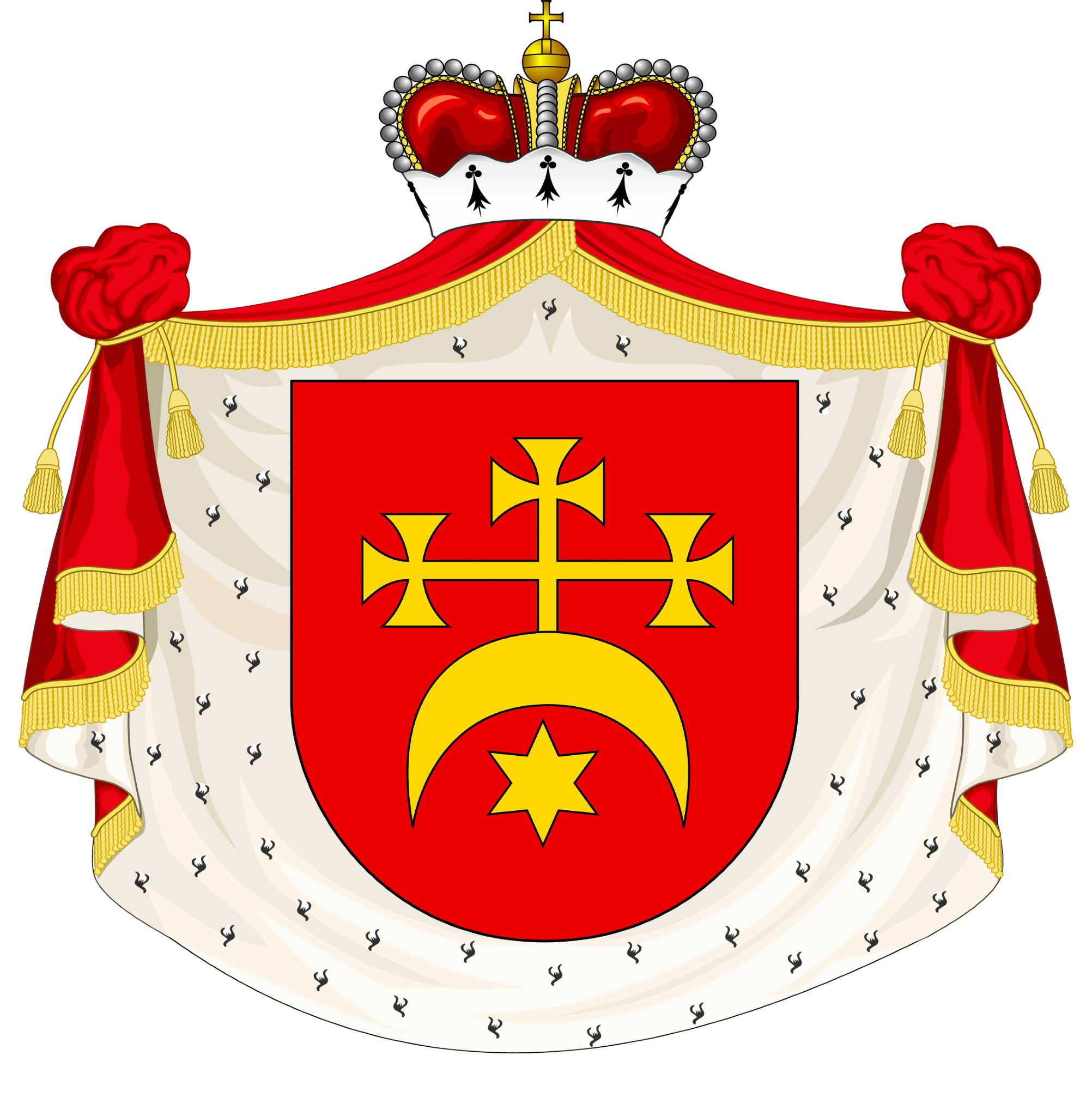
- Parent house: House of Zbaraski
- Country: Polish–Lithuanian Commonwealth
- Founded: 15th century 1669 Free election
- Founder: Michał Zbaraski Wiśniowecki
- Current head: None, Extinct
- Final ruler: Michael I of Poland
- Titles: King of Poland; Grand Duke of Lithuania; Grand Duke of Ruthenia; Grand Duke of Prussia; Grand Duke of Masovia; Grand Duke of Samogitia; Grand Duke of Livonia; Grand Duke of Smolensk; Grand Duke of Kiev; Grand Duke of Volhynia; Grand Duke of Podolia; Grand Duke of Podlasie; Grand Duke of Severia; Grand Duke of Chernihiv; Voivode of Belz; Voivode of Ruthenia; Koniuszy

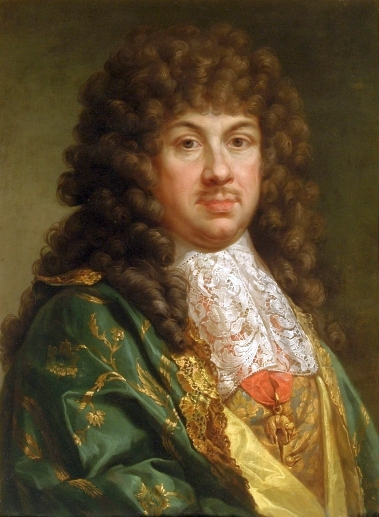
King Michael I

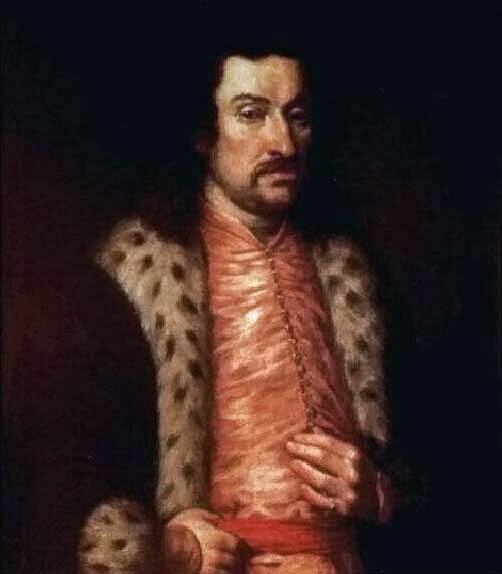
Jeremi Wiśniowiecki

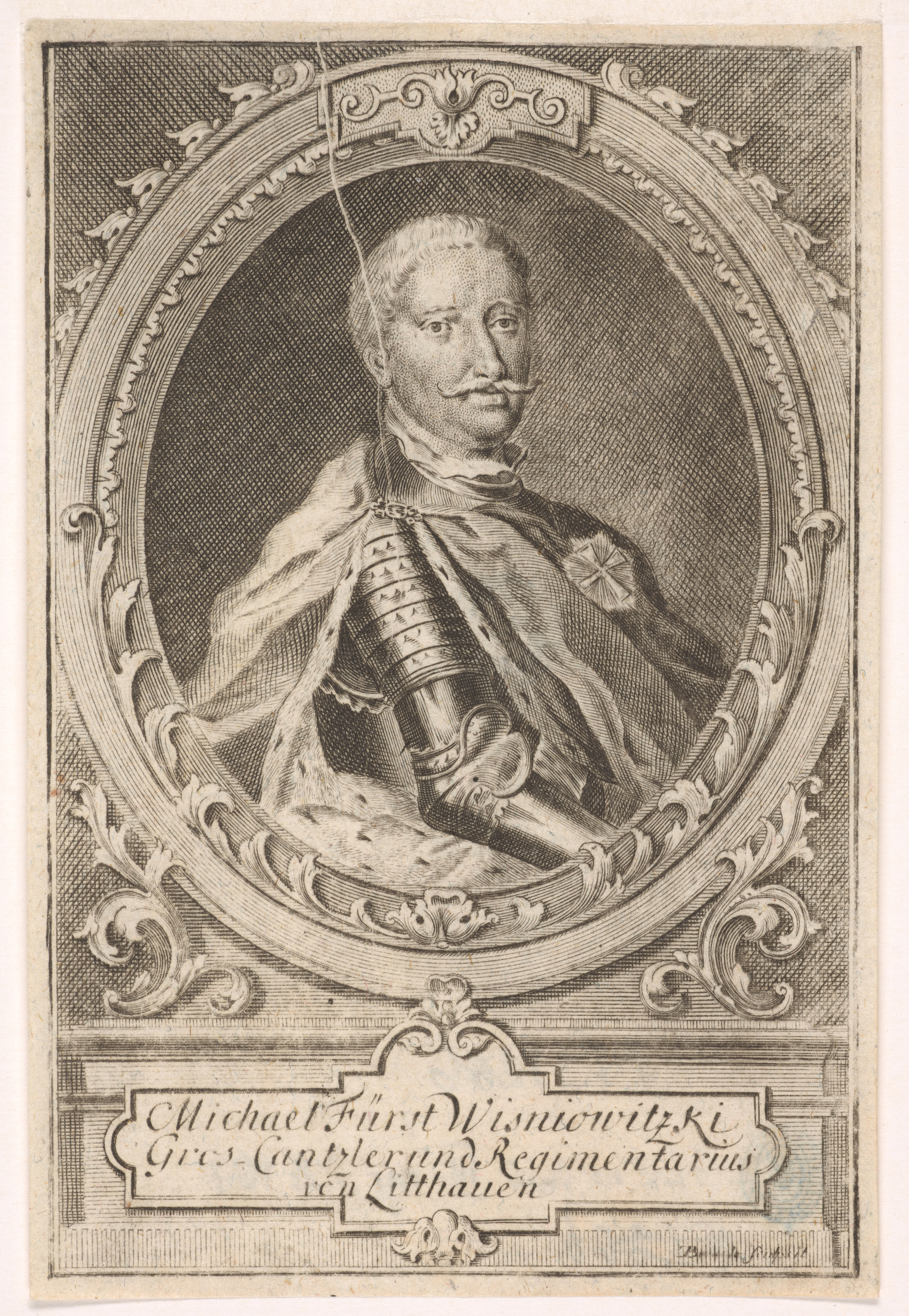
Michał Serwacy Wiśniowiecki

The House of Wiśniowiecki (Lithuanian: Višnioveckiai, Ukrainian: Вишневецькі, romanized: Vyshnevetski) was a Polish-Lithuanian princely family of Ruthenian origin, notable in the history of the Polish–Lithuanian Commonwealth. They were powerful magnates with estates predominantly in the Ruthenian lands of the Crown of the Kingdom of Poland, and they used the Polish coat of arms of Korybut.

The family is a cadet branch of the House of Zbaraski.

== History ==
The family tradition would trace their descent to the Gediminids, but modern historians believe there is more evidence for them to have descended from the Rurikids. According to the Gediminids relation theory, the ancestor of the family was Duke Kaributas (Ruthenian: Dymitr Korybut), a son of the Grand Duke of Lithuania, Algirdas. Kaributas was stripped of the Duchy of Severia and transferred to Volhynia and Podolia where he was given to govern cities of Vinnytsia and Kremenets, and Zbarazh as a private estate. At first Zbarazh was inherited by Ivan, but in 1434 it was passed on to the second son of Korybut Fedor of Nieśwież. The latter became a progenitor of such princely families like Porycki, Woronecki, Zbaraski. In the 15th century Wiśniowiecki family split away from House of Zbaraski.

The family place was city of Wiśniowiec (now Vyshnivets). At first Wiśniowiecki estates were located predominantly in Volhynia, but since 1580s also included on left-bank Ukraine in a region around Lubny, Romny, others that in the past belonged to the princes Glinski and Daumantas.

From their days as Ruthenian nobility, they held the title of Kniaz (prince). By the late 16th century, the family converted from Orthodox to Catholicism and became Polonized. They gained much importance in the Polish–Lithuanian Commonwealth, with vast possessions in the 16th to 18th centuries on the territories of today's Ukraine, particularly the town of Vyshnivets (Wiśniowiec). Their estates were so vast and their position so powerful that they were known as the most powerful of magnates – the "kinglings" or "kinglets" ("królewięta"). Their ancestral seat was the Vyshnivets Castle.

The family's golden age was the 17th century, when its members accumulated much wealth and influence, held numerous important posts within the Commonwealth. Likely the most notable members of this family were Michael I, king of Poland and Grand Duke of Lithuania from 1669 to 1673, his father Jeremi Wiśniowiecki, as well as Dmytro Vyshnevetsky who was an important Cossack leader.

== Coat of arms ==
The coat of arms of the House of Wiśniowiecki was the Korybut coat of arms.

Coat of Arms of King Michał Korybut Wiśniowiecki

== Notable family members ==
Possessions of Wiśniowiecki family are marked in red

- Michał Zbaraski Wiśniowiecki (died after 1516), Prince at Wiśniowiec, progenitor of the Wiśniowiecki family
  - Feodor Wiśniowiecki (died in 1533), married Maria of Moldavia, married secondly Princess Anastasia Zilinska (died after 1535)
  - Iwan Wiśniowiecki (died after 1516), courtier, married Nastazja Olizarowicz h. Chorągwie
    - Konstanty Wiśniowiecki (before 1516–1574), courtier, starost of Żytomierz, married Anna Elżbieta Swierszcz z Olchowca h. Jastrzębiec
      - Konstanty Wiśniowiecki (1564–1641), voivode of Belz and Ruthenia, married Anna Zahorowska h. Korczak, Urszula Mniszech h. Mniszech, Katarzyna Korniaktowna h. Krucyni and Krystyna Strusiówna h. Korczak
        - Marianna Wiśniowiecka (1600–1624), married voivode of Bełz and Ruthenia Marshal Jakub Sobieski h. Janina, the father of King of Poland Jan III Sobieski
        - Janusz Wiśniowiecki (1598–1636), Master of the Stables of the Crown, married Katarzyna Eugenia Tyszkiewicz h. Leliwa
          - Dymitr Jerzy Wiśniowiecki (1631–1682), Great Guard and Hetman of the Crown, voivode of Belz and Kraków, married Marianna Zamoyska h. Jelita
          - Konstanty Krzysztof Wiśniowiecki (1633–1686), voivode of Podlasie of Bracław and Bełz, married Urszula Teresa Mniszech h. Mniszech and Anna Chodorowska h. Korczak
            - Janusz Antoni Wiśniowiecki (1678–1741), voivode of Wilno and Marshal, married Teofilia Leszczyńska h. Wieniawa
              - Urszula Franciszka Wiśniowiecka (1705–1753), dramatist and writer, married voivode of Troki and Hetman Prince Michał Kazimierz "Rybeńko" Radziwiłł h. Trąby
            - Michał Serwacy Wiśniowiecki (1680–1744), the last male representative of the Wiśniowiecki family, Hetman, Castellan and Voivode of Wilno, Great Chancellor of Lithuania, married Katarzyna Dolska h. Kościesza, Maria Magdalena Czartoryska h. Czartoryski and Tekla Róża Radziwiłł h. Trąby
    - Dmytro Vyshnevetsky, also known as Baida, first Ataman of the Ukrainian Cossacks, Hetman of the Registered Cossacks
  - Aleksander Wiśniowiecki (c. 1500–1555), starost of Rzeczyce, married Katarzyna Skoruta h. Korczak
    - Michał Wiśniowiecki (1529–1584), castellan of Bracław and Kiev, married Halszka Zenowiczówna h. Deszpot
      - Michał Wiśniowiecki (died 1616), starost of Owrucz, married Regina Mohyła
        - Jeremi Wiśniowiecki (1612–1651), Prince at Wiśniowiec, Łubny and Chorol, voivode of Ruthenia, married Gryzelda Konstancja Zamoyska h. Jelita
          - Michał Korybut Wiśniowiecki (Michael I, 1640-1673), King of Poland 1669–1673, married Eleanor of Austria, Queen of Poland
        - Anna Wiśniowiecka, married starost of Lublin Zbigniew Firlej h. Lewart
    - Aleksander Wisiowiecki (1543–1577), courtier, married Aleksandra Kapusta h. Kapusta
      - Adam Wiśniowiecki (c. 1566–1622), married Aleksandra Chodkiewicz h. Kościesza, daughter of Hetman Jan Hieronimowicz Chodkiewicz h. Kościesza and Krystyna Zborowska h. Jastrzębiec

== Gallery of estates ==
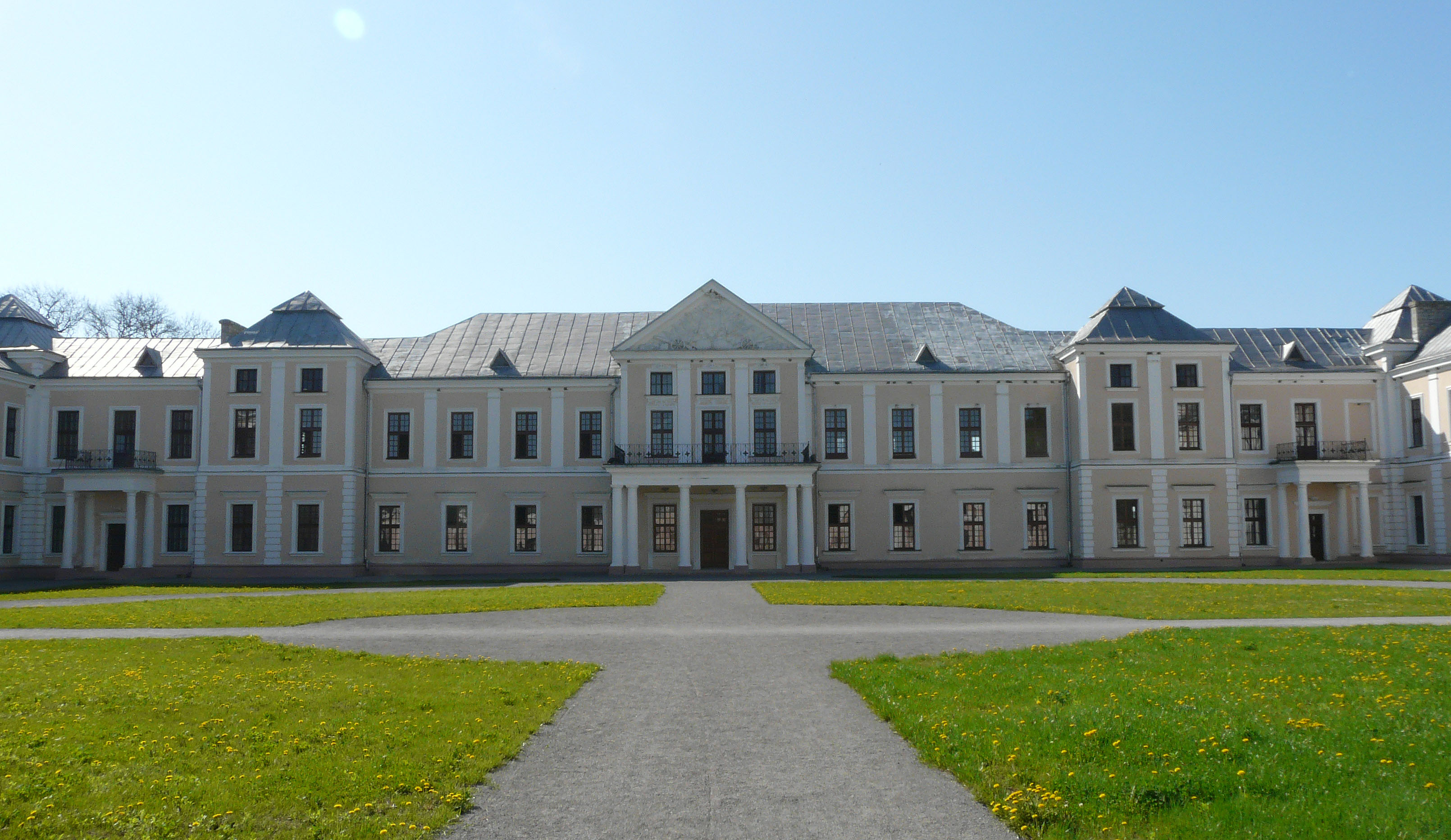
Vyshnivets Palace

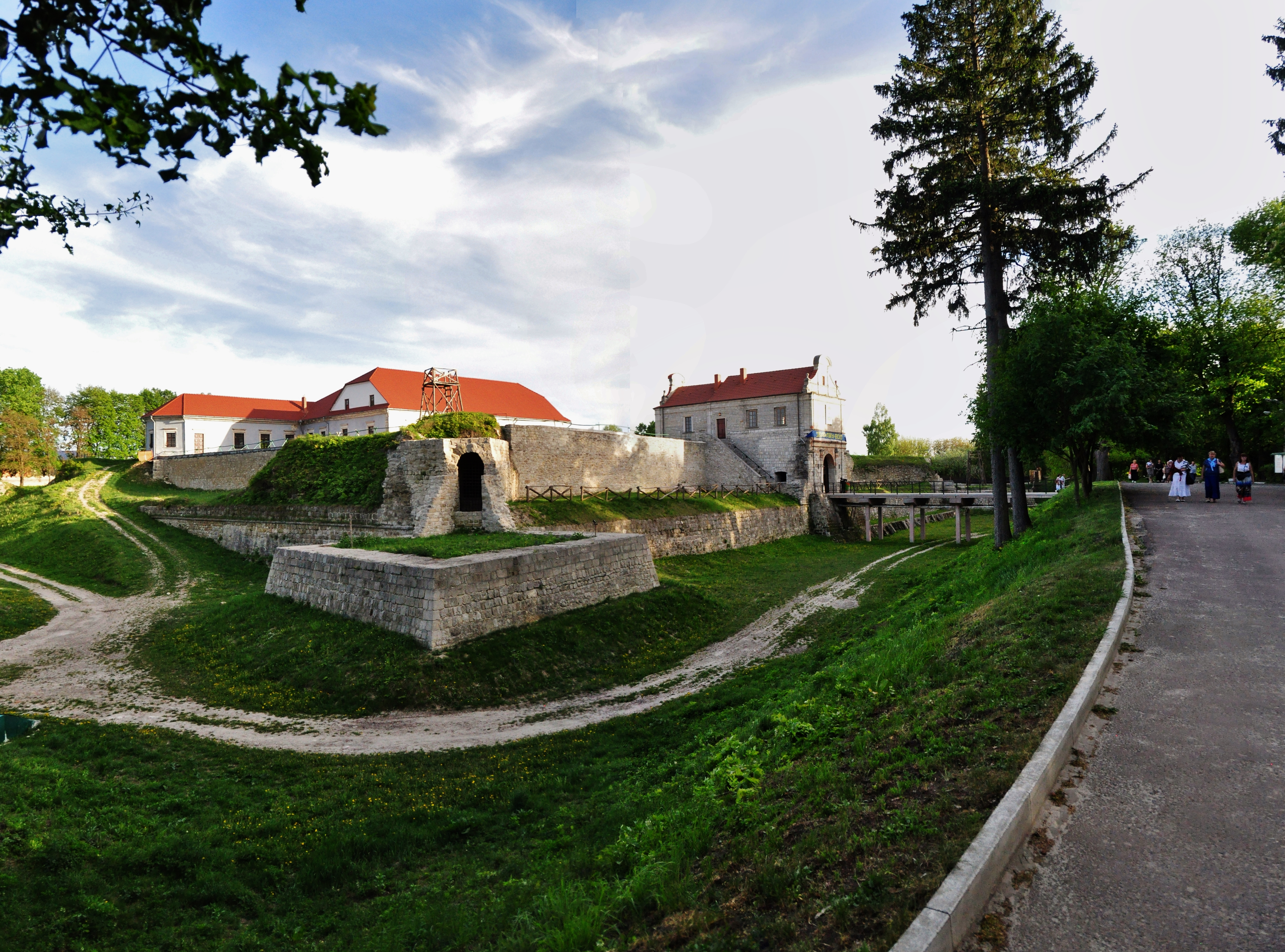
Zbarazh Castle

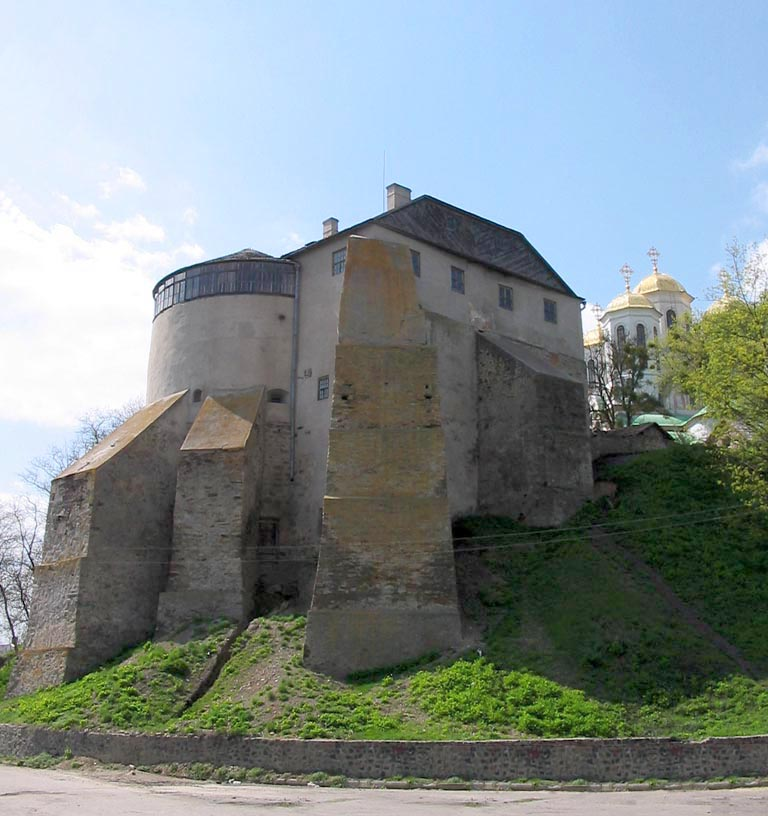
Castle of Ostroh

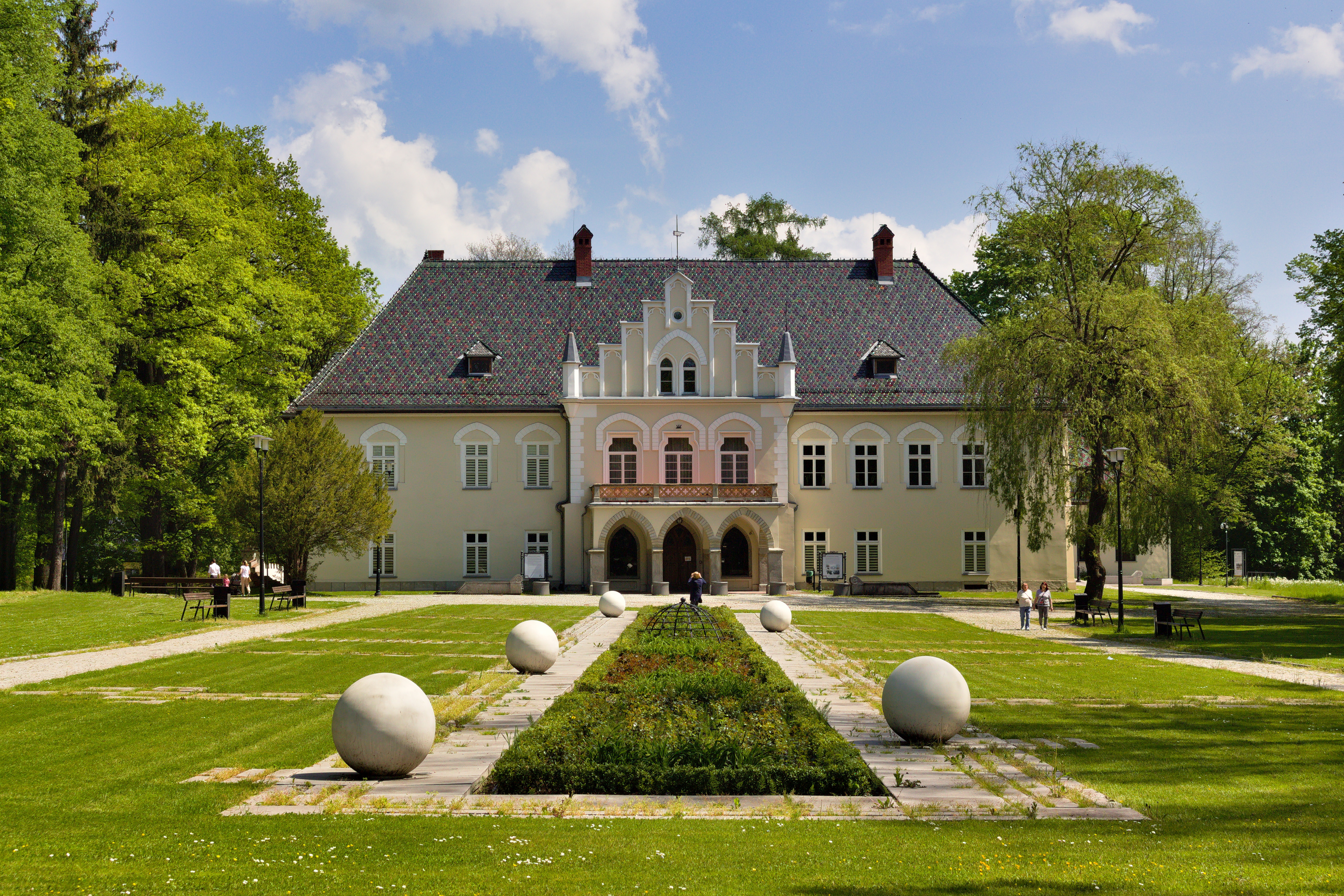
Manor house in Łodygowice

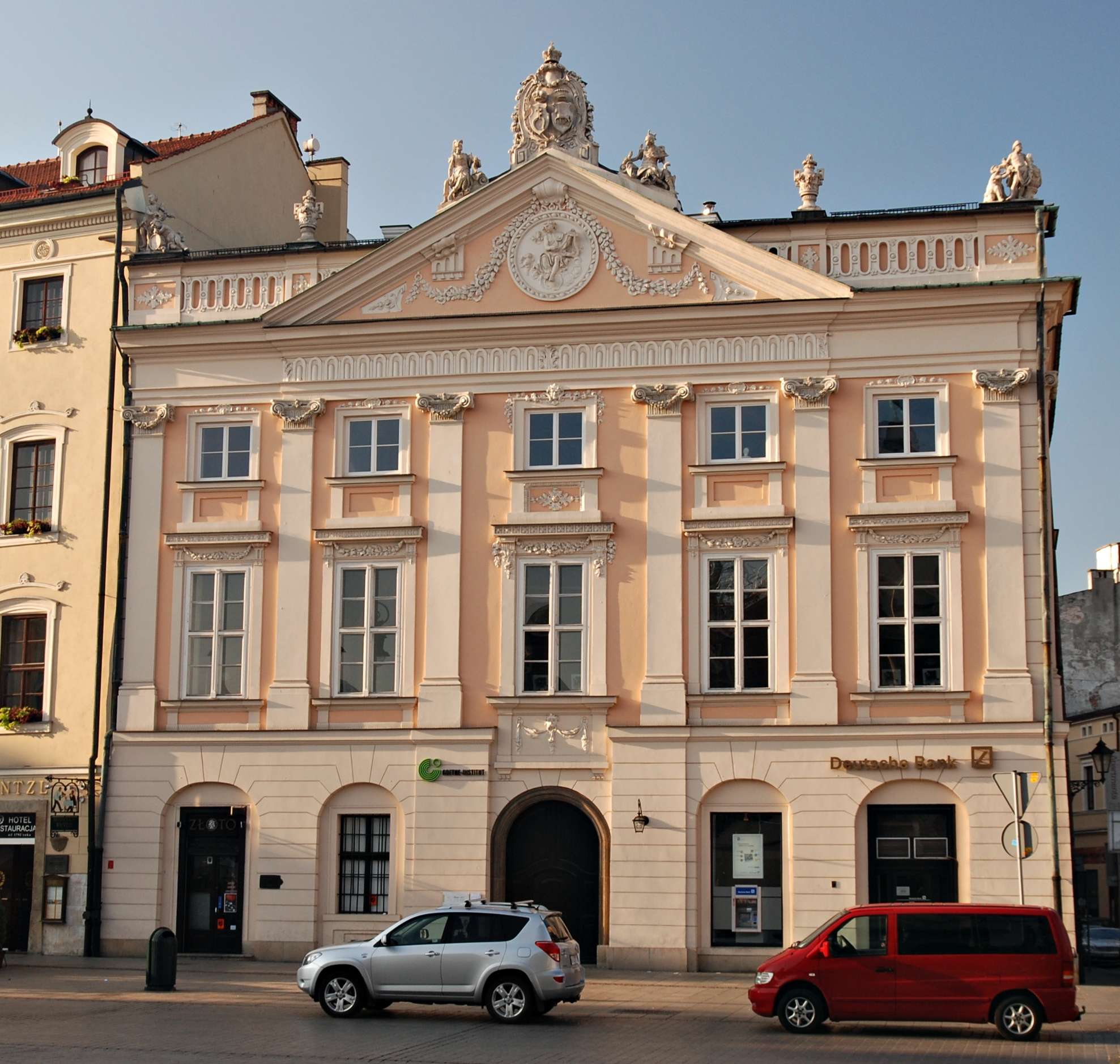
Zbarski Palace in Kraków

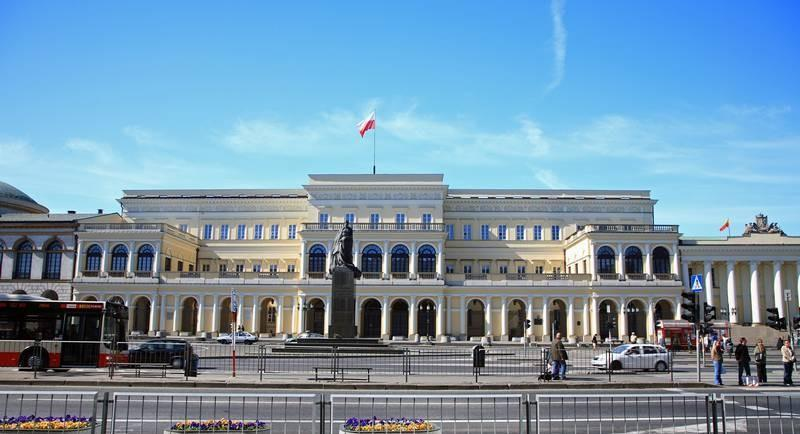
Palace of the Minister of the Treasury in Warsaw (rebuilt from the former Wiśniowiecki Palace)

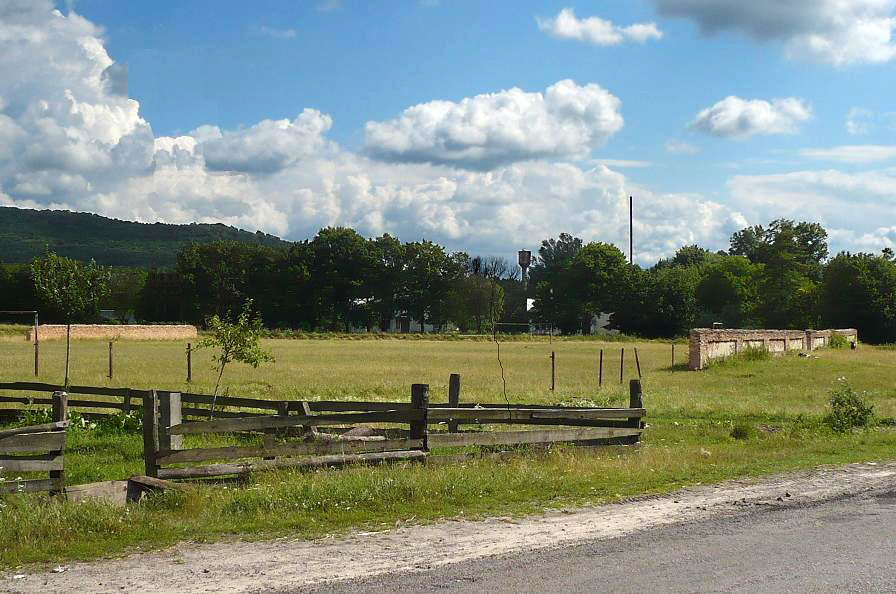
Ruins of the Castle of Biały Kamień

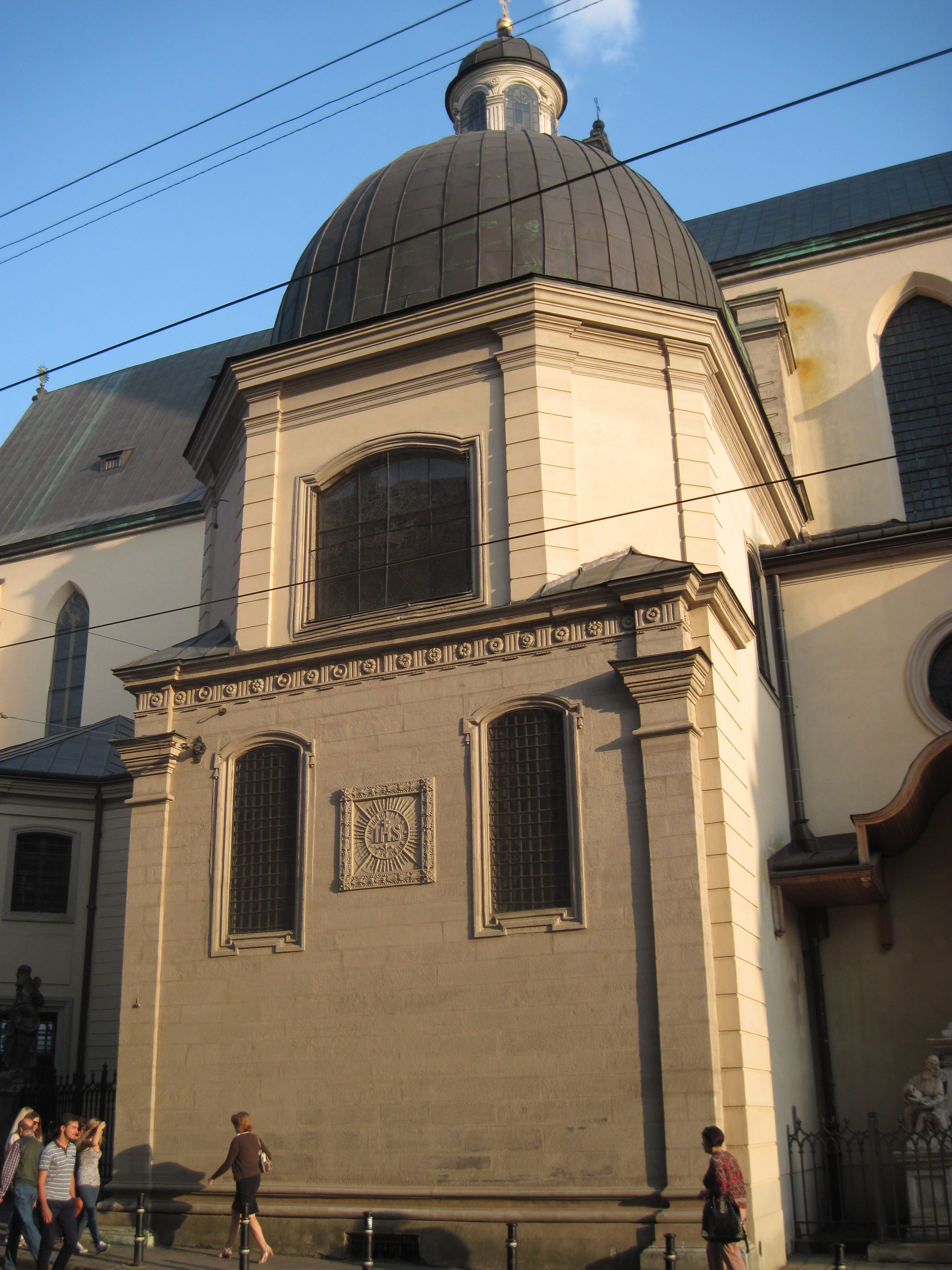
Wisniowiecki Chapel (Latin Cathedral in Lviv)

== See also ==
- Wiśniowiec
- Lithuanian nobility
- Kings of Poland
- Szlachta
