= Michał Wiśniowiecki (1529–1584) =

Michał Wiśniowiecki Mykhailo Vyshnevetsky
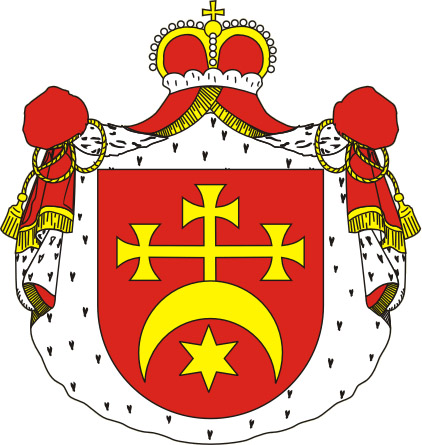
- Coat of arms: Korybut
- Born: 1529
- Died: 1584 (aged 54–55)
- Family: Wiśniowiecki
- Consort: Halszka Zenowiczówna h. Deszpot
- Father: Aleksander Wiśniowiecki h. Korybut
- Mother: Katarzyna Skoruta z Mołdaczyc h. Korczak

Michał Wiśniowiecki or Mykhailo Vyshnevetsky (1529–1584) was a Ruthenian noble (szlachcic) of the Polish–Lithuanian Commonwealth. He was a prince at Wiśniowiec, magnate, Hetman of the Registered Cossacks (1578–1581; appointed by Stephen Báthory), castellan of Bracław and Kijów (now Kyiv), starost of Czerkasy, Kaniów, Lubeka and Łojów.

Wisnowiecki was born before the Union of Lublin in the Grand Duchy of Lithuania. He was a cousin of Dmytro Vyshnevetsky; they were both grandsons of Mykhailo Vyshnevetsky-Zbarazky. As Hetman, he commanded the Registered Cossacks in battle during the Livonian War against Muscovy, especially in Siveria in the years 1580–1581.

== Marriage and issue ==
Michał married Halszka Zenowiczówna h. Deszpot and had five children

- Aleksander Wiśniowiecki (ca. 1560–1594), starost of Czerkasy, Kaniów, Korsuń Szewczenkowski, Lubeka and Łojów, married Helena Jełowiecka h. Jełowiecki
- Michał Wiśniowiecki (died 1616), married Regina Mohyła, father of Jeremi Wiśniowiecki, grandfather of King Michał Korybut Wiśniowiecki
- Jerzy Wiśniowiecki (died 1618), married Teodora Czaplica h. Kierdeja
- Maryna Wiśniowiecka, married Teodor ks. Drucki-Horski h. Druck
- Zofia Wiśniowiecka (1595 – died after 1612), married Jerzy Ostafi Tyszkiewicz h. Leliwa

He would become the great-grandfather of the future King of Poland, Michał Korybut Wiśniowiecki.

== See also ==
- List of szlachta

== Bibliography ==
- Filip Sulimierski, Bronisław Chlebowski, Władysław Walewski, Słownik geograficzny Królestwa Polskiego i innych krajów słowiańskich, t. V, Warszawa, 1880–1902, s. 36.
- Mytsyk, Yuri Andriyovych (2003). "Вишневецькі" [Vyshnevetsky]. Encyclopedia of History of Ukraine (in Ukrainian). Vol. 1. Kyiv: Institute of History of Ukraine. pp. 519–520. Archived from the original on 8 October 2026.
