= Michał Wiśniowiecki =

Polish–Lithuanian noble (died 1616)

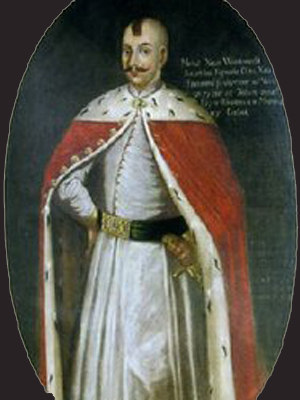

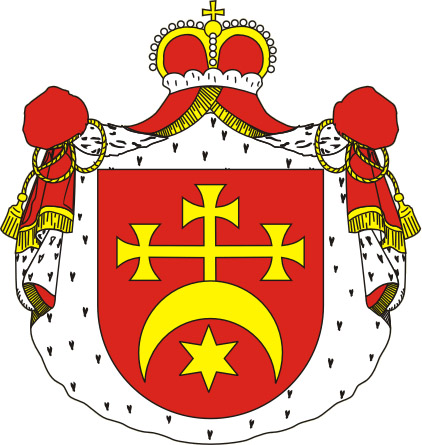
- Coat of arms: Korybut
- Died: 1616
- Family: Wiśniowiecki
- Consort: Regina Mohyła
- Issue: Jeremi Michał Wiśniowiecki; Anna Wiśniowiecka
- Father: Michał Wiśniowiecki h. Korybut
- Mother: Halszka Zenowiczówna h. Deszpot

Michał Wiśniowiecki (Ukrainian: Михайло Михайлович Вишневецький; died 1616) was a Polish–Lithuanian noble (szlachcic), prince of Wiśniowiec, and magnate. He was also starost of Owrucz (now Ovruch, Ukraine) from December 1604.

He was the son of Michał Wiśniowiecki.

He took part in the Magnate wars in Moldavia and supported False Dmitry I and False Dmitriy II during Russia's Time of Troubles and the Polish–Russian War. He was also involved in extinguishing Nalyvaiko Uprising.

His son Jeremi after his death was raised by his relative, Konstanty Wiśniowiecki, and eventually became a powerful magnate, one of the most famous members of the Wiśniowiecki family. His daughter Anna Wiśniowiecka was a potential marriage candidate to the king Władysław IV Waza in 1636. Although Władysław was quite supportive of the marriage, it was blocked by the Sejm. Anna eventually married Zbigniew Firlej between 1636 and 1638.

== Marriage and issue ==
Michał married Regina Wisniowiecka and had two children:

- Jeremi Michał Wiśniowiecki, voivode of Ruthenia, married Gryzelda Zamoyska h. Jelita; they became the parents of the future Polish–Lithuanian monarch, Michał Korybut Wiśniowiecki.
- Anna Wiśniowiecka, married starost of Lublin Zbigniew Firlej h. Lewart

== See also ==
- List of szlachta
