= Hustynia Monastery =

Eastern Orthodox monastery in Ukraine

- Ukrainian: Густинський Троїцький монастир
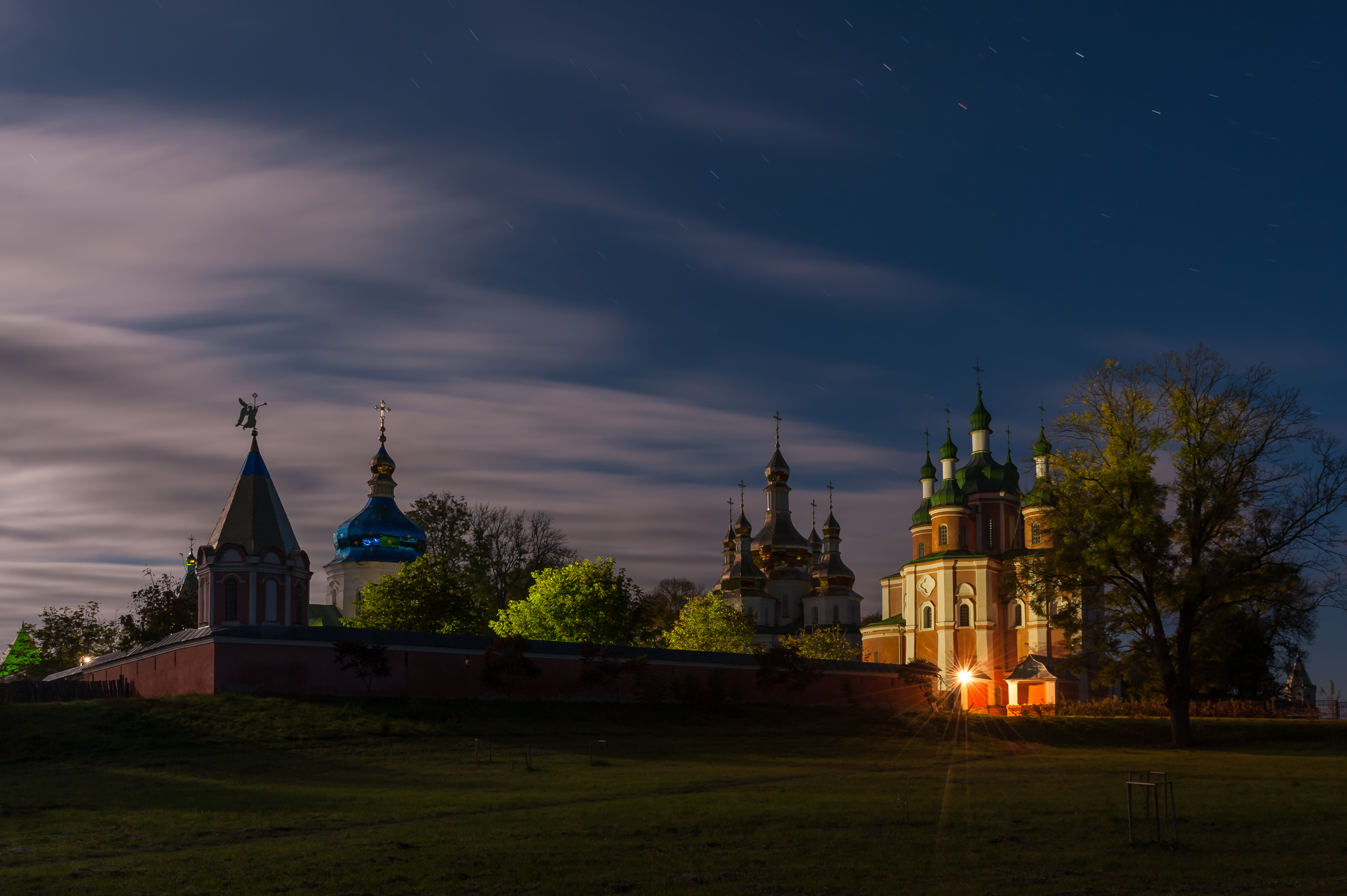
- Hustyn Monastery at night

- Location within Chernihiv Oblast Location within Ukraine
- Alternative names: Holy Trinity Hustyn Female Monastery

General information
- Architectural style: Ukrainian Baroque
- Location: Hustynia, Chernihiv Oblast, Ukraine
- Coordinates: 50°38′11″N 32°28′24″E
- Owner: Ukrainian Orthodox Church (Moscow Patriarchate)

Immovable Monument of National Significance of Ukraine
- Official name: Густинський монастир (Hustynia Monastery)
- Type: Architecture
- Reference no.: 250095

The Hustynia Monastery of the Holy Trinity (Ukrainian: Густинський Троїцький монастир) is a historical monastery located by the Udai river in the village of Hustynia near Pryluky in Ukraine. The monestry is famous for preserving in its walls the Hustyn Chronicle manuscript, which is an important source on Ukrainian history.

== History ==
The monastery was established on the lands owned by noble Wiśniowiecki family during the early 17th century. According to a chronicle, it was founded by monks of Mezhyhiria Monastery on an island in the middle of Udai river. The monastery was reportedly named after a nearby thick (Ukrainian: густий) forest. In 1614 a wooden church of Holy Trinity was erected. The monastery was expanded through the work of abbot Isaiah Kopynsky of Kyiv Pechersk Lavra, who was granted a charter securing the monastery's landholdings by prince Michał Korybut Wiśniowiecki and his wife Regina Mohyla. After a conflict with Polish authorities, Isaiah moved to Hustynia, and later served as metropolitan of Chernihiv, Smolensk and Kyiv. In 1620 the monastery was visited by patriarch Theophanes III of Jerusalem, who arrived under the guard of Zaporozhian Cossacks led by hetman Petro Konashevych Sahaidachny.

In 1636 a fire destroyed the monastery's structures, and two years later it was moved to a new location. After the suppression of a Cossack uprising in 1638 part of the monks who feared Polish repressions moved to the Tsardom of Moscow. In 1639 the monastery was rebuilt under the patronage of metropolitan Petro Mohyla, with financial support from Moldavian ruler Vasile Lupu. In 1641-1644 the new Trinity Church was erected.

In 1648 the monastery was destroyed by rebels, but soon thereafter Bohdan Khmelnytsky took it under his protection. The monastery's land properties were confirmed by a universal issued by the hetman's wife Hanna Zolotarenko in 1655. In 1654 the monastery was visited by Paul of Aleppo, who claimed its iconostasis to be more opulent than that of Kyiv's St. Sophia Cathedral.

After another fire, the monastery was rebuilt in stone by hetman Ivan Samoilovych in 1674-1676. The new Church of Holy Trinity was consecrated by archbishop Lazar Baranovych, who ordained hieromonk Demetrius Tuptalo during his visit. Between the end of 17th and early 18th centuries the monastery was greatly expanded with buildings in the style of Ukrainian Baroque. In 1693-1708 the churches of Saint Nicholas and St. Peter and Paul were erected under patronage of Pryluky colonel Dmytro Horlenko, grandfather of Joasaph of Belgorod. The monastery's Assumption Church was built by hetman Ivan Mazepa.

By the late 18th century Hustynia Monastery was one of the richest convents in Ukraine, however in 1786 its properties were secularized by Russian authorities, and in 1793 it was closed. In 1843 the monastery was reopened. In 1845 it was visited by Taras Shevchenko, who made a drawing of the convent's historical structures. During the same year governor-general Nikolai Repnin was buried in the crypt of the Assumption Church. The monastery's churches were later renovated by Repnin's widow Varvara, and the newly reconsecrated Church of the Resurrection became the family's burial vault.

In 1924 the monastery was dissolved and replaced with a commune for homeless children. In 1927 its structures were studied by historian Mykola Makarenko, whose son was buried in the Repnin family vault. In 1943 the monastery was revived and functioned until 1959, when a psychoneurological clinic was opened in its place. By the early 1990s the buildings of the monastery were in a state of ruin, but in 1993 a new revival of the complex started, and since then its architectural ensemble has been restored in its initial Baroque form. Currently it functions as a female monastery.

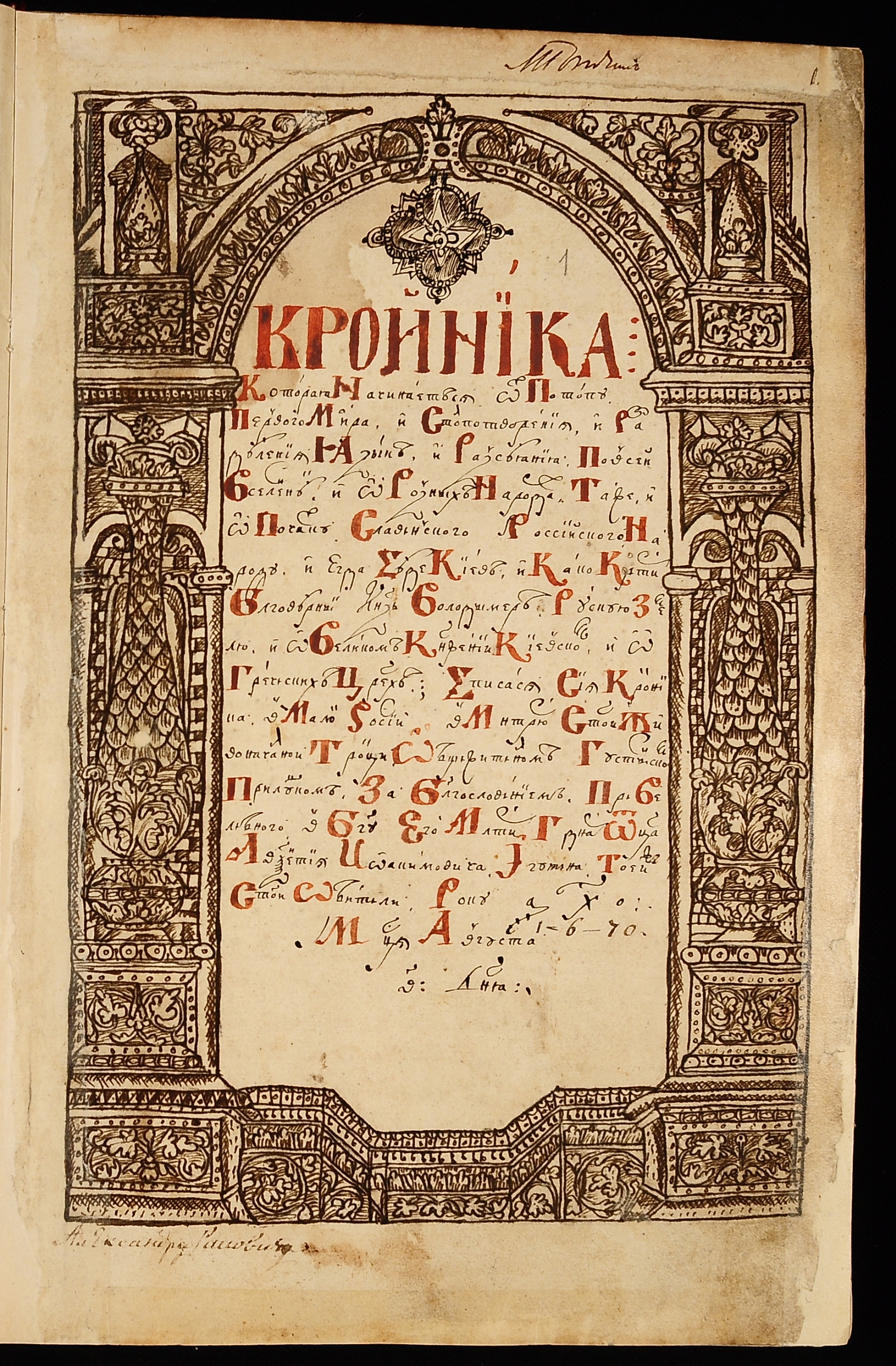
Title page of Hustyn Chronicle

== Chronicles ==
The Hustyn Chronicle, possibly written by Zacharias Kopystensky in Kyiv during the 1620s, is the first historical work to present a generalized panorama of Ukrainian history. Ending with the year 1597, it survived to our days in a copy created in 1670 by Hustynia hieromonk M. Losytsky and describes the relations between Ukraine and Lithuania, Poland, Khanate of Crimea and Turkey, contains information about the Union of Brest, emergence of Cossacks etc. Another important document created by monks of the monastery is the Hustynia Monastery Chronicle (1600-1641), which presents an important source on local history.

== Structures ==
- Holy Trinity Church (1670s)
- Church of Saints Peter and Paul (1693-1708)
- Resurrection (Refectory) Church (1695, rebuilt in 1844)
- Saint Nicholas Gate Church
- Rectory building with the Church of St. Barbara
- Defensive walls

== Gallery ==
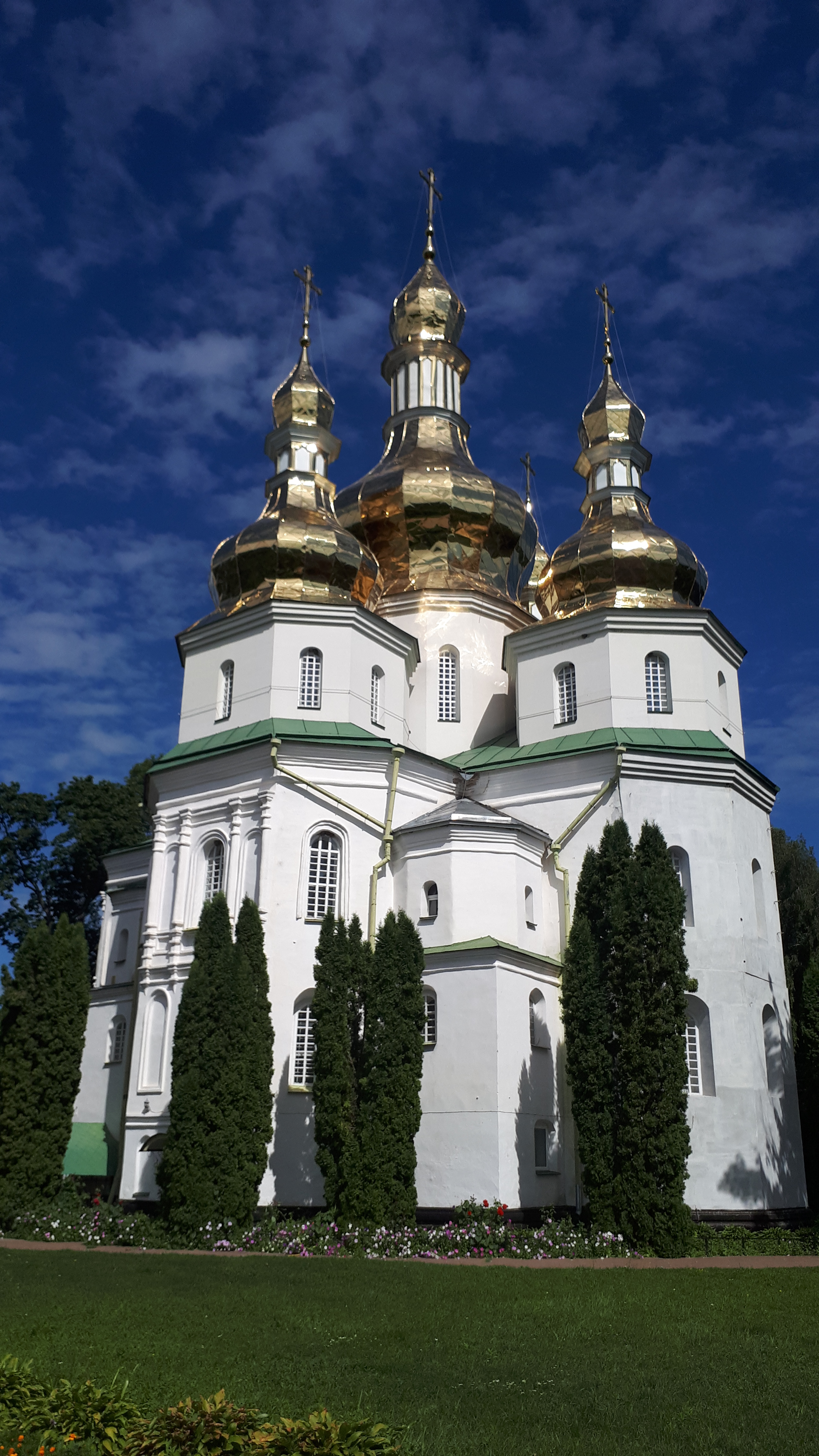
Holy Trinity Church

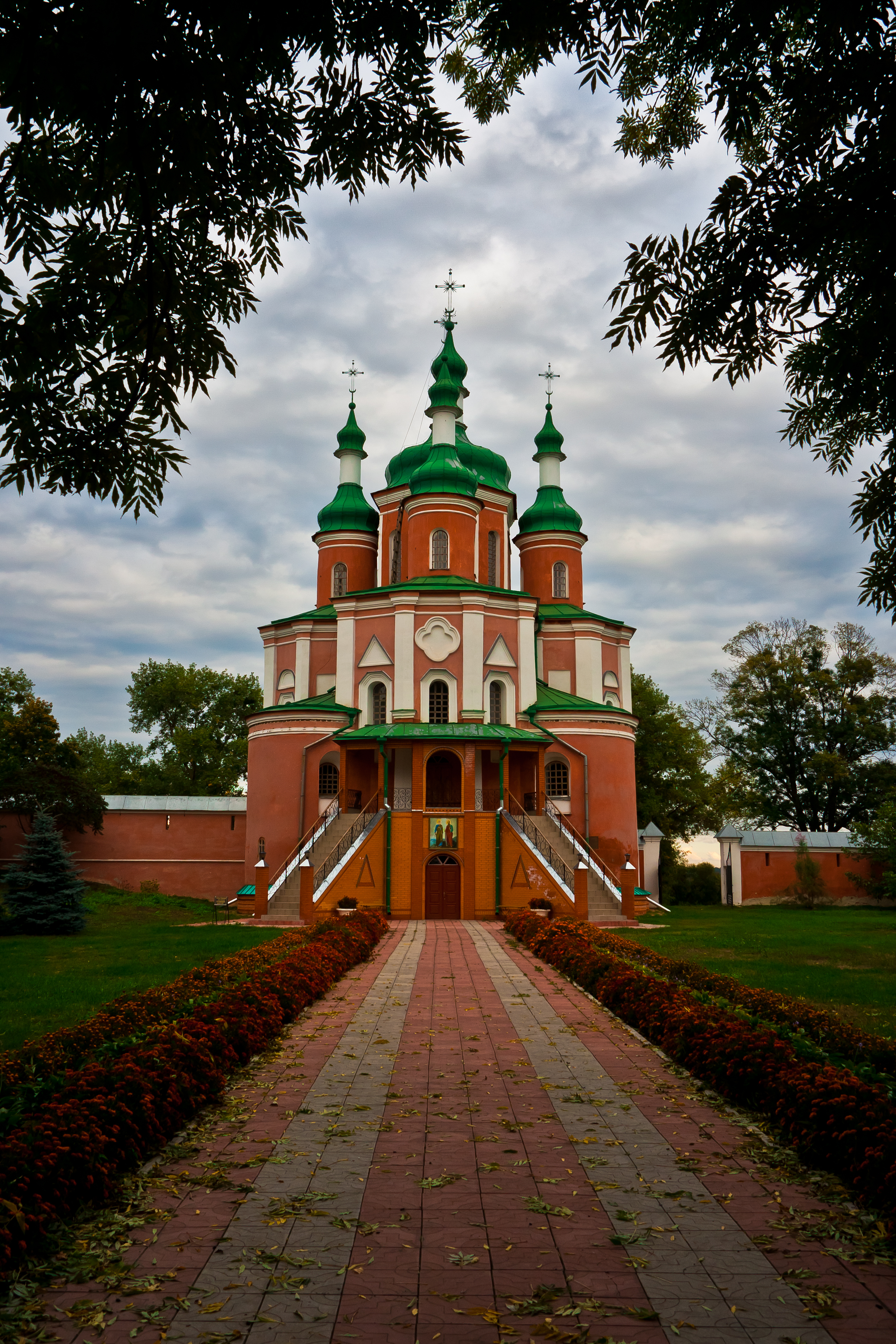
Saint Peter and Paul Church

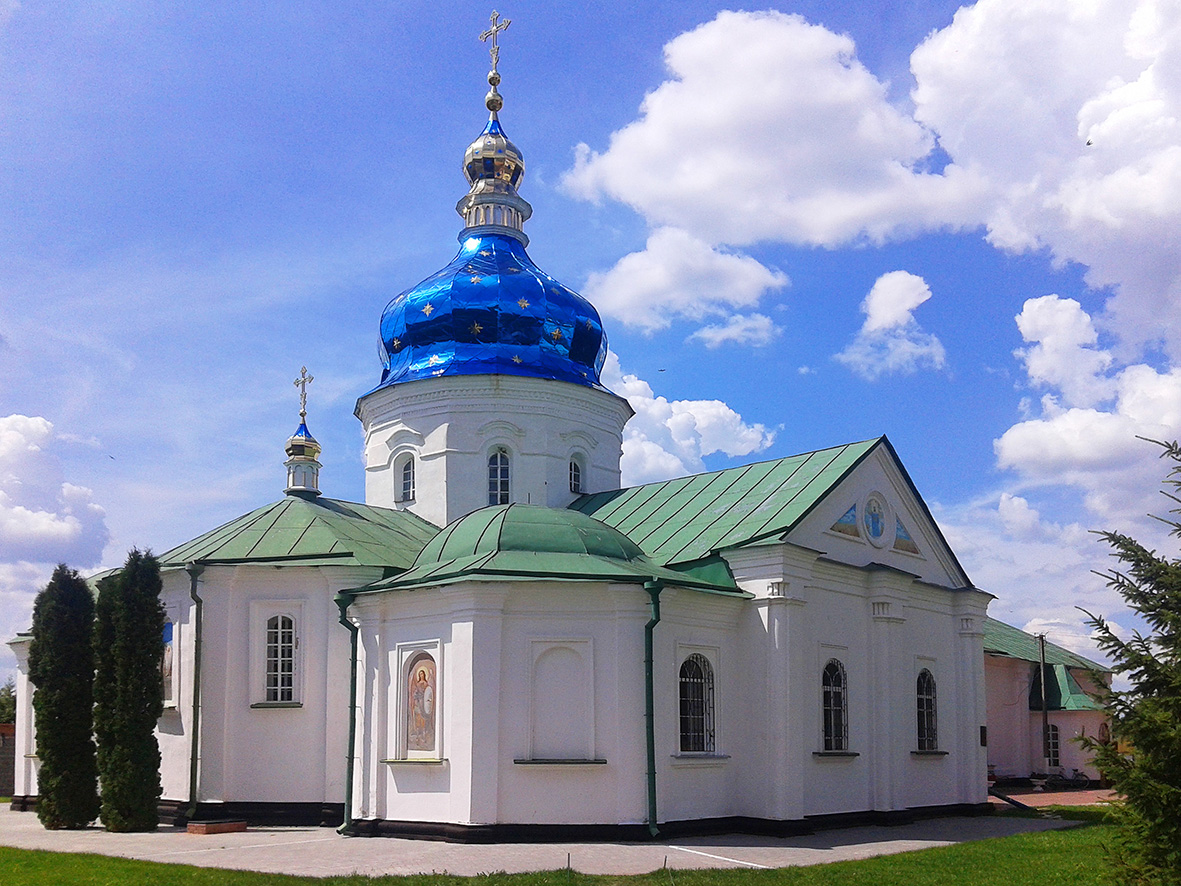
Resurrection Church

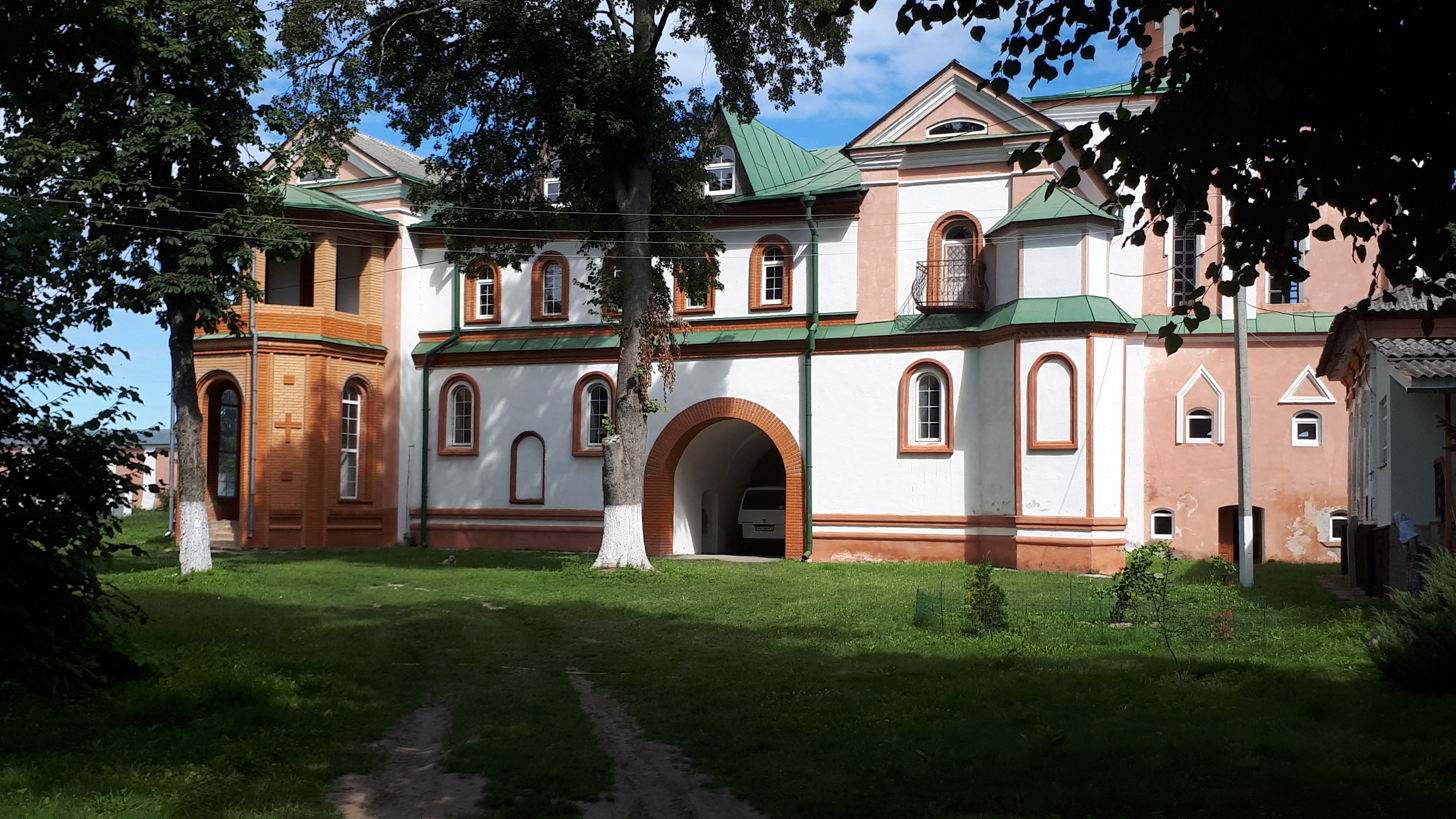
Prior's house (rectory)

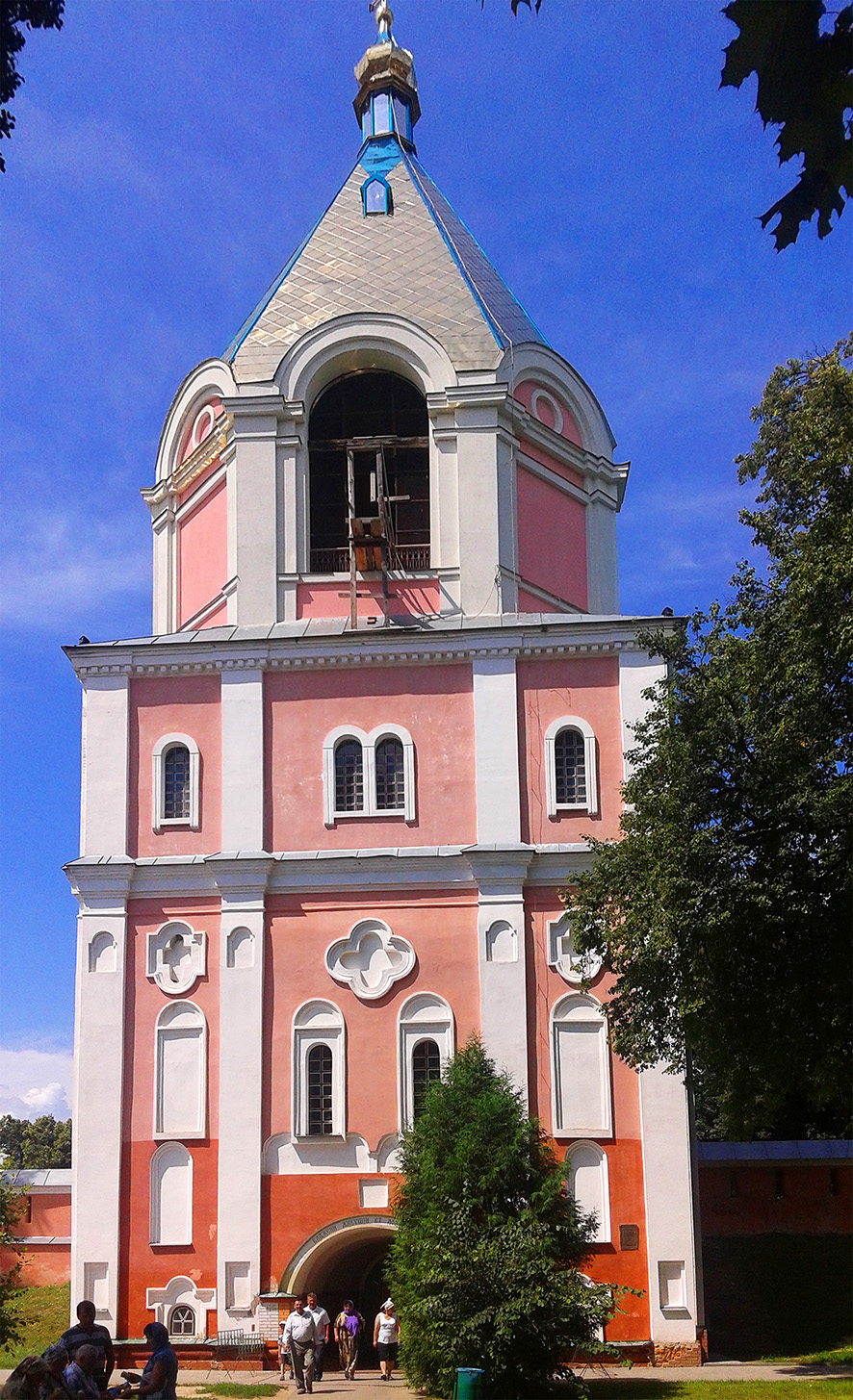
St. Nicholas gate church

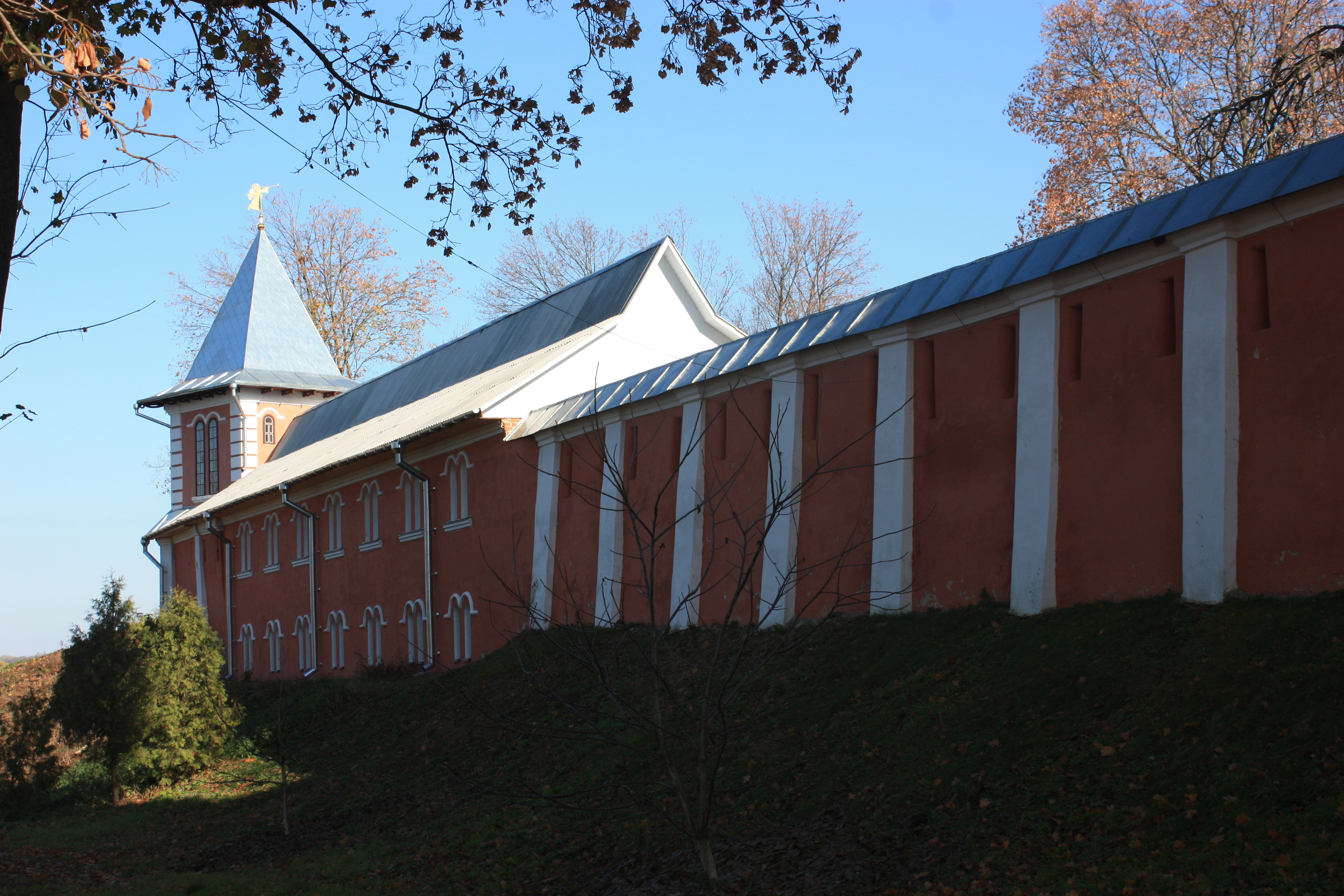
Defensive wall

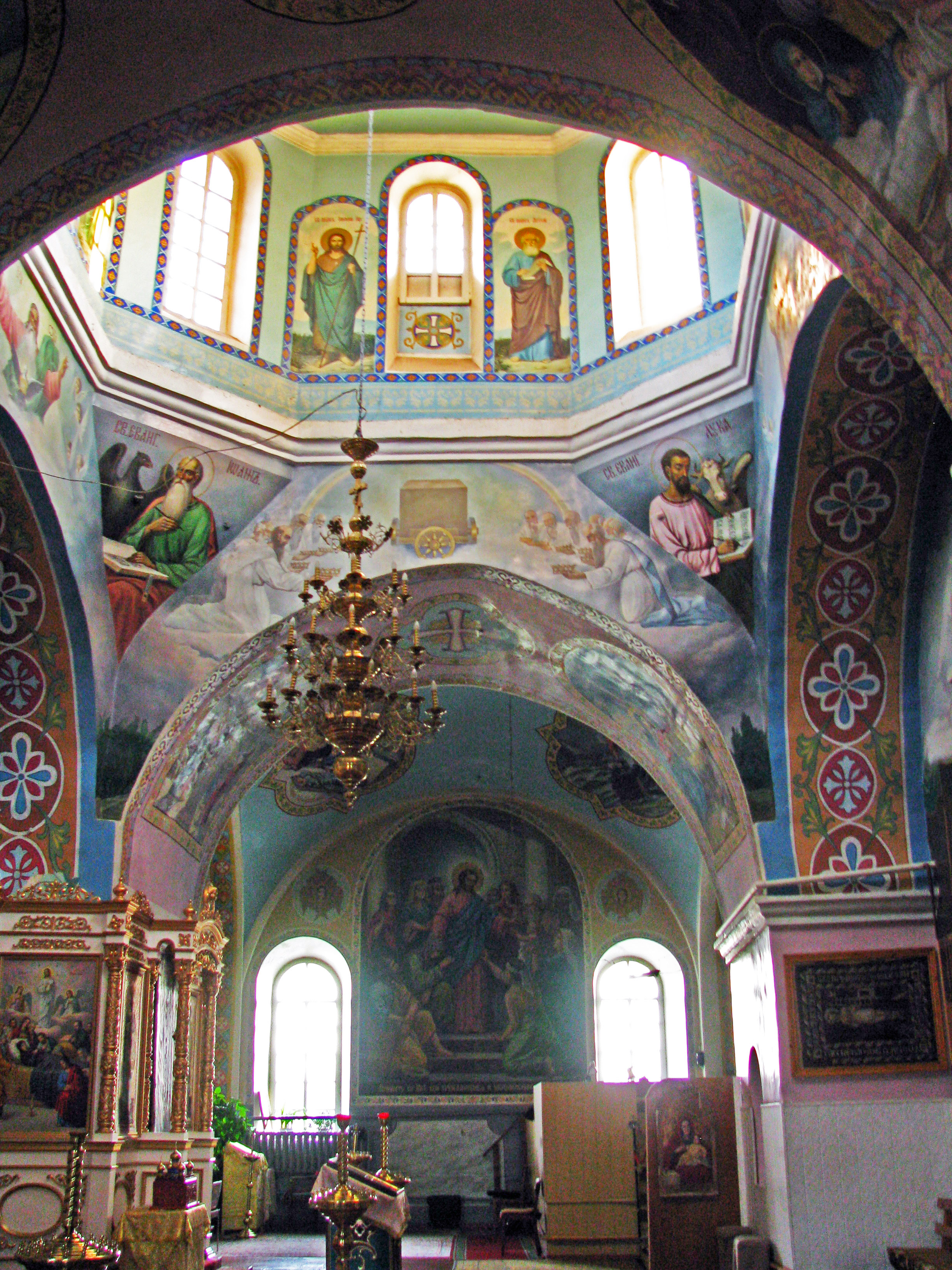
Interior of the Refectory Church

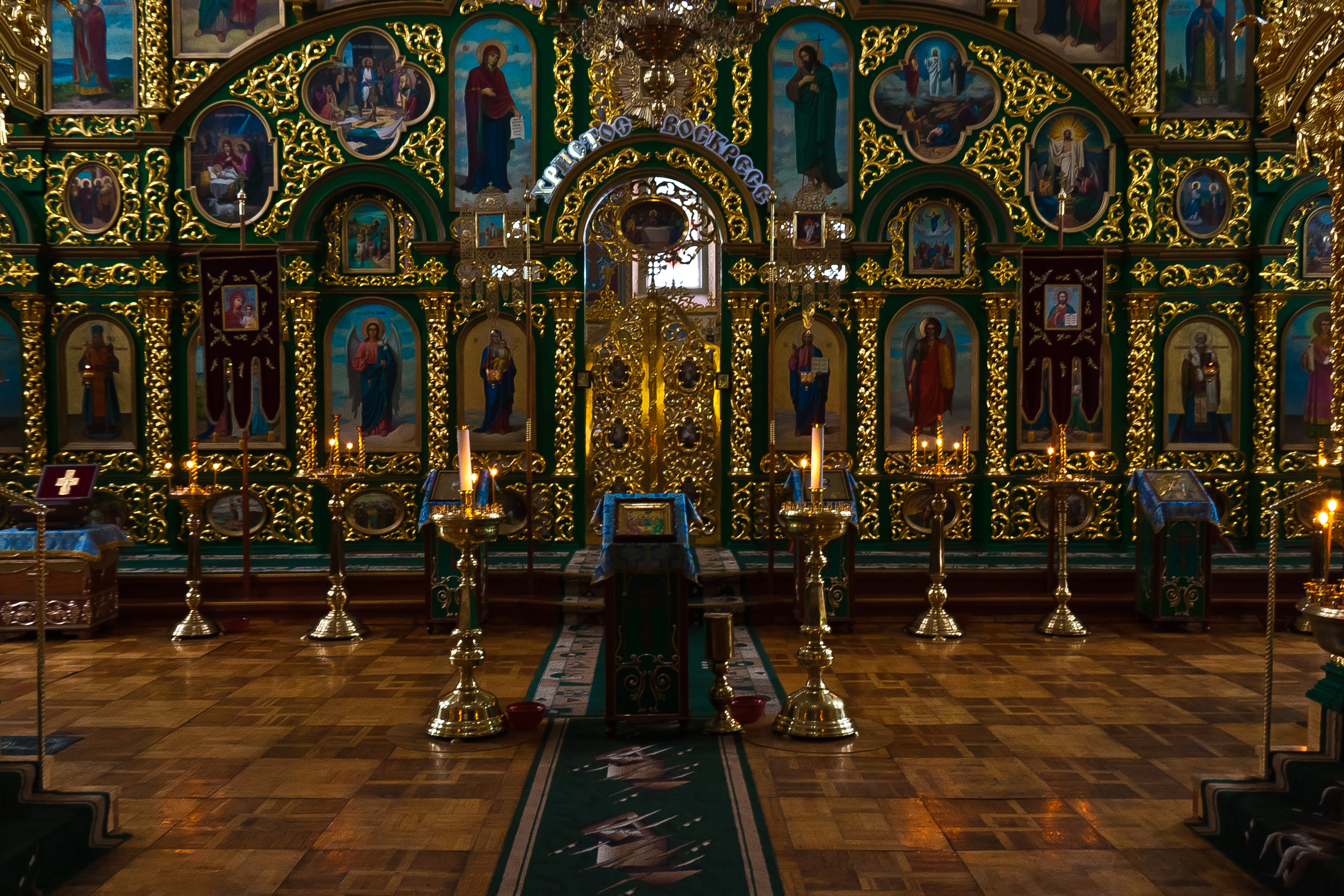
Iconostasis of the Trinity Cathedral
