= Albrycht Władysław Radziwiłł =

Polish–Lithuanian noble (1589–1636)

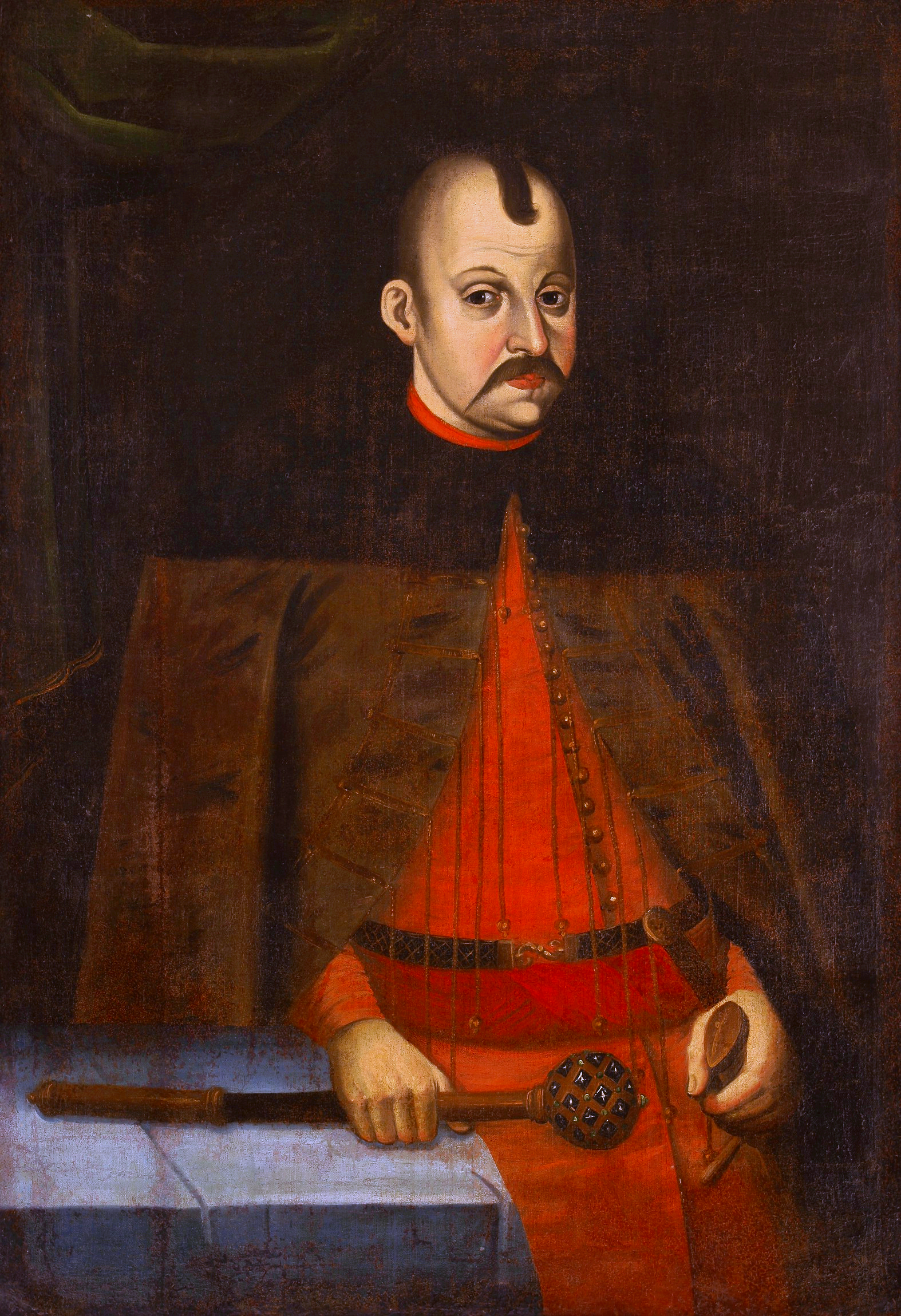
- Portrait, 1635
- Coat of arms: Trąby
- Full name: Albrycht Władysław Radziwiłł herbu Trąby
- Born: 16 June 1589; Nieśwież
- Died: 20 July 1636 (aged 47); Czernawczyce
- Family: Radziwiłł
- Spouses: Princess Anna Sapieha h. Lis; Anna Zofia Zeonowicz h. Deszpot
- Father: Mikołaj Krzysztof "Sierotka" Radziwiłł h. Trąby
- Mother: Elżbieta "Halaszka" Eufemia Wiśniowiecka h. Korybut

Albrycht Władysław Radziwiłł (16 June 1589 – 20 July 1636) was a Polish–Lithuanian noble. Castellan of Troki from 1626 until 1633, castellan of Wilno from 1633. The 3rd ordynat of the Nieśwież Fee Tail, stolnik of Lithuania since 1620 and krajczy of Lithuania since 1622. Starost of Ryki and Szerszewy.

Son of Mikołaj Krzysztof "Sierotka" Radziwiłł h. Trąby and Princess Elżbieta "Halaszka" Eufemia Wiśniowiecka h. Korybut, the daughter of voivode of Wołyń Prince Andrzej Wiśniowiecki h. Korybut and Eufemia Wierzbicka h. Radwan, daughter of Jerzy Wierzbicki h. Radwan and sister of Bishop Wiktoryn Wierzbicki h. Radwan.

== Marriage and issue ==
Albrycht Władysław married Princess Anna Sapieha h. Lis, the daughter of Prince Lew Sapieha and Elżbieta Radziwiłł h. Trąby in 1618 in Wilno. He married the second time (a year after Anna's death) in 1628 Anna Zofia Zenowicz h. Deszpot, the daughter of castellan of Połock and starosta of Mińsk Mikołaj Bogusław Zenowicz h. Deszpot and Anna Chodkiewicz h. Kościesza, the daughter of Hieronim Chodkiewicz h. Kościesza and Anna Tarło h. Topór.

He had five children. With Princess Anna Sapieha h. Lis:

- NN Radziwiłł
- NN Radziwiłł
- NN Radziwiłł

And with Anna Zofia Zenowicz h. Deszpot:

- NN Radziwiłł
- Elżbieta Radziwiłł (1629-1688), Benedictine
- Kolumba Konstancja Radziwiłł (1635-1687), prioress of the Carmelite nuns in Wilno
