= Konstanty Wiśniowiecki =

Polish noble (1564–1641)

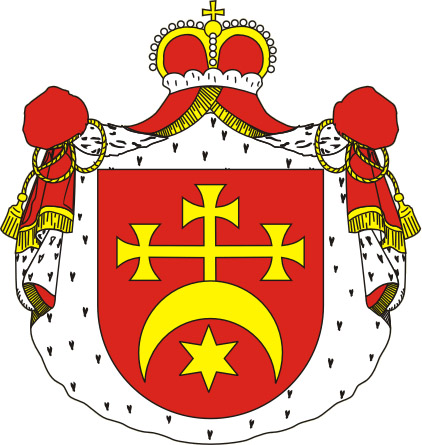
- Coat of arms: Korybut
- Born: 1564
- Died: 1641 (aged 76–77)
- Family: Wiśniowiecki
- Consort: Urszula Mniszech h. Mniszech; Krystyna Strusiówna h. Korczak; Anna Zachorowska h. Korczak; Katarzyna Korniakt h. Krucyni
- Issue: Konstanty Krzysztof Wiśniowiecki
- Father: Konstanty Korybut-Wiśniowiecki
- Mother: Anna Elżbieta Świerszcz h. Jastrzębiec

Prince Konstanty Wiśniowiecki (1564–1641) was a Polish nobleman, voivode of Belz since 1636, of Ruthenia since 1638 and starost of Czerkasy and Kamieniec was a wealthy, powerful and influential magnate, experienced in both politics and warfare.

== Marriage and issue ==
He was married four times:

- circa 1583 Anna Zahorowska Korczak; had issue
  - son Janusz Wiśniowiecki (1598–1636), daughters Helena Wiśniowiecka (married Stanisław Warszycki) and Marianna Wiśniowiecka (1600–1624; married Jakub Sobieski)
- 1603 Urszula Mniszech, sister of Maryna Mniszech; had issue
  - sons Jerzy Wiśniowiecki (died 1641) and Aleksander Wiśniowiecki (died 1638/39), daughter Teofila Wiśniowiecka
- 1626/28 Katarzyna Korniaktowna (died circa 1635); no issue – daughter of Konstanty Korniakt h. Krucyni
- Krystyna Strusiówna h. Korczak (died after 1647); no issue

Wiśniowiecki outlived all of his three sons; after his death, his estate was inherited by Prince Jeremi Wiśniowiecki.

== Bibliography ==
- Czamańska I., Wiśniowieccy. Monografia rodu, Wydawnictwo Poznańskie, Poznań 2007, ISBN 978-83-7177-229-0, s. 147–155.
