= Nataliia Sobkovych =

Ukrainian artist, and art critic (born 1968)

- Наталія Собкович
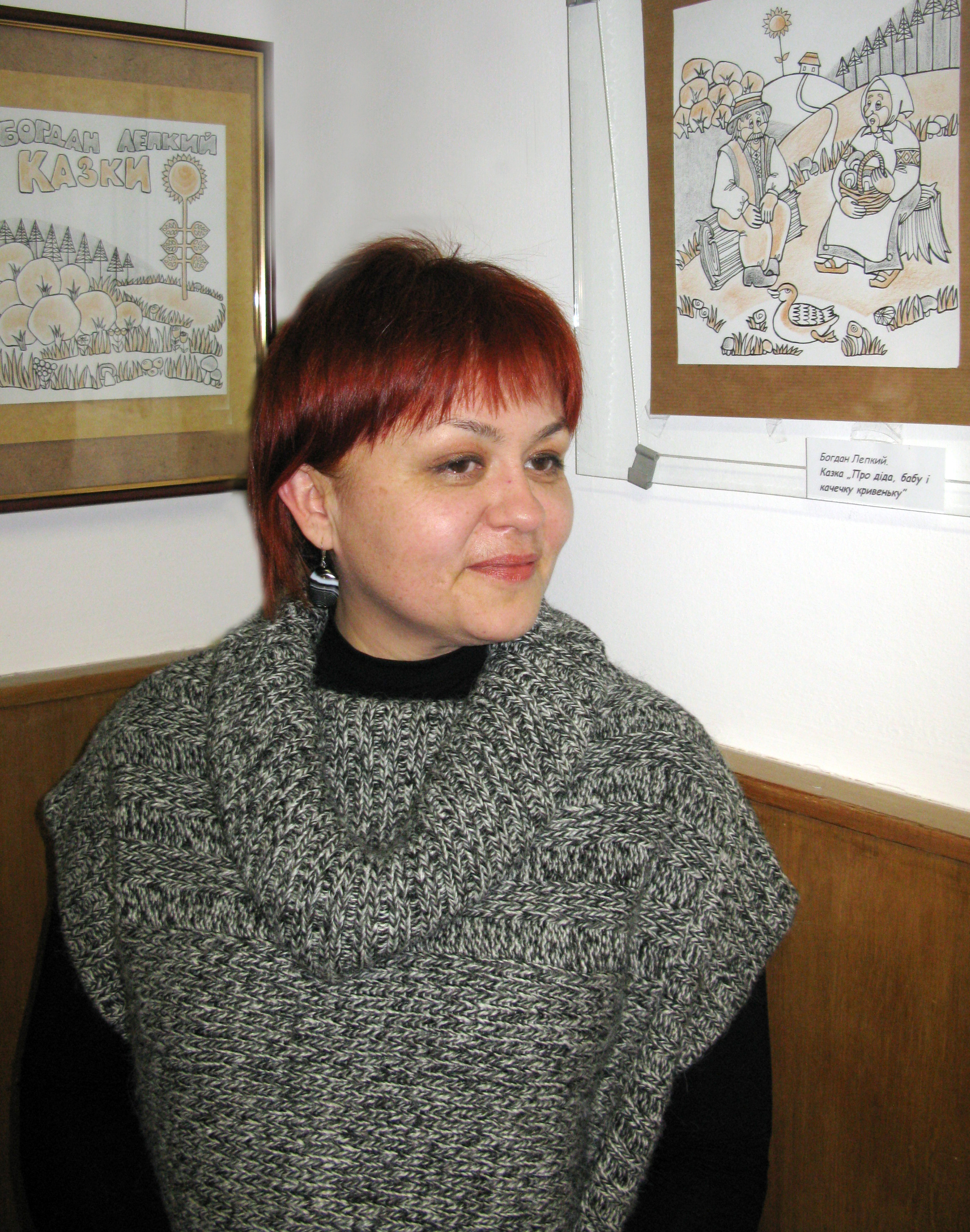
- Born: Nataliia Hryhorivna Sobkovych; 18 May 1968 (age 58); Vyshnivets, Ternopil Oblast, Ukraine
- Education: National Academy of Visual Arts and Architecture
- Occupations: Artist, and art critic

Nataliia Hryhorivna Sobkovych (Ukrainian: Наталія Григорівна Собкович, born 18 May 1968, Vyshnivets, Ternopil Oblast) is a Ukrainian artist and art critic.

== Biography ==
She graduated from the Department of Artistic Weaving of the Vyzhnytsia School of Applied Arts (1987), the Faculty of Theory and History of Art of the Ukrainian Academy of Arts (1997). She worked as a teacher at the Ternopil Children's Art School (1990–1996), the chief curator of the Ternopil Regional Art Museum (1996–2003), a teacher of fine arts theory at the Design Department of the Ternopil Cooperative College and the Theater Department of the Ternopil Music College; from 2003 – chief specialist of the Department of Culture (now the Department of Culture and Tourism) of the Ternopil Regional State Administration.

From 1975 he has been living in Bila, Ternopil Raion.

== Creativity ==
As an artist, she works in the fields of tapestry, batik, painting, and graphics. She is a researcher of the works of the Ukrainian-American artist Jacques Hnizdovsky and the fine arts heritage of Bohdan Lepky, as well as contemporary artists of the Ternopil region. The artist's works are kept in museums and private collections in Ukraine, Poland, the USA, and Bulgaria.

Personal exhibitions in Ternopil (1998, 2006, 2012, 2015), Berezhany (2005, 2012), Kremenets (2006, 2015), Zbarazh (2007), Kopychyntsi (2007, 2015), Przemyśl (2009, Poland), Pochaiv (2015), Stawiski (2016, Poland) and others. Participant of art plein airs and post-plein air exhibitions (from 2006).

She is the author of scientific research, popular publications on art, design, illustrations, and the compiler of the publications "Never Again Poetry" by O. Leshchyshyn (2009), "Fairy Tales" by B. Lepkyi (2012), and "Tales of the Blackthorn Field" (2017). She published an album of her own works "Weaving. Batik" (2006).

Author of introductory articles, design and compiler of publications: "Graphics by Jacques Hnizdovsky in the Collections of Museums of Ternopil Region" (2015), Catalog of the exhibition on the occasion of the 100th anniversary of the Ukrainian-American artist Jacques Hnizdovsky at the American House in Kyiv (2015), Catalog of the exhibition on the occasion of the 100th anniversary of the Ukrainian-American artist Jacques Hnizdovsky (Lviv-Chernivtsi-Kyiv-Poltava-Cherkasy-Dnipropetrovs'k, 2015), "Fine Arts Heritage of Bohdan Lepkyi" (2015), bibliographic index "Jacques Hnizdovsky" (2015).

== Adwards ==
- Laureate of the Ternopil Regional Volodymyr Hnatiuk Prize (2015)
