= Regina Wiśniowiecka =

Polish noble lady of Moldavian origin

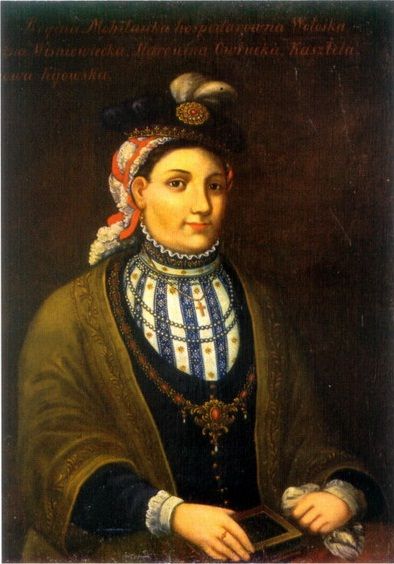
Portrait of Regina Wisniowiecka of unknown artist, National Museum of the History of Ukraine

Personal coat of arms, Mohyla

Regina Wisniowiecka (Polish: Regina Wiśniowiecka, Ukrainian: Раїна Вишневецька), also known as Regina Mohilianka or Raina Mohylianka (Ukrainian: Раїна Могилянка, 1589-1619) was a Polish noble lady of Moldavian origin. She was a wife of Michał Wiśniowiecki and patron of Eastern Orthodox Christianity in the Polish–Lithuanian Commonwealth.

== Life ==
She was a daughter of Moldavian hospodar Ieremia Movilă and his wife Elisabeta Movilă, and a cousin of Metropolitan of Kiev Peter Mohyla. Due to the conflict with Michael the Brave, 1600 Ieremia was forced to move his family to the Galician town of Ustia (now the village of Ustia-Zelene in Chortkiv Raion).

In 1603, at the age of 14, Regina married Polish-Ruthenian magnate Michał Wiśniowiecki in the city of Suceava, Moldavia.

She was a philanthropist and supported a number of monasteries in Ukrainian lands, including the convents in Pryluky, Hustyn, Ladan and Mhar Monastery near Lubny.

== Family ==
Regina was married only to Michał Wiśniowiecki and had at least four children with him.

- Jeremi Wiśniowiecki (1612-1651)
- Alexander Wiśniowiecki (?-1629)
- Jerzy Wiśniowiecki (?-1629)
- Anna (?-1648), married Zbigniew Firlej
