= Krystyna Strusiówna =

Polish noblewoman

Krystyna Strusiówna (1605-1647), was a Polish noblewoman. She became infamous for the great scandal of 1625, in which she committed incest by marrying her nephew Adam Kalinowskim and eloped with him.
