= Zbigniew Firlej =

Polish–Lithuanian noble (c. 1613 – 1649)

Zbigniew Firlej (c. 1613–1649), of Lewart coat of arms, was a noble of the Polish–Lithuanian Commonwealth. Starost of Lublin. Son of Mikołaj Firlej and Regina Oleśnicka. Married to Anna Wiśniowiecka, daughter of Michał Wiśniowiecki (around 1636–1638); and to Katarzyna Opalińska, daughter of Łukasz Opaliński, in 1647.
