= Vyshnivets =

Rural locality in Ternopil Oblast, Ukraine

Vyshnivets Вишнівець
- Rural settlement
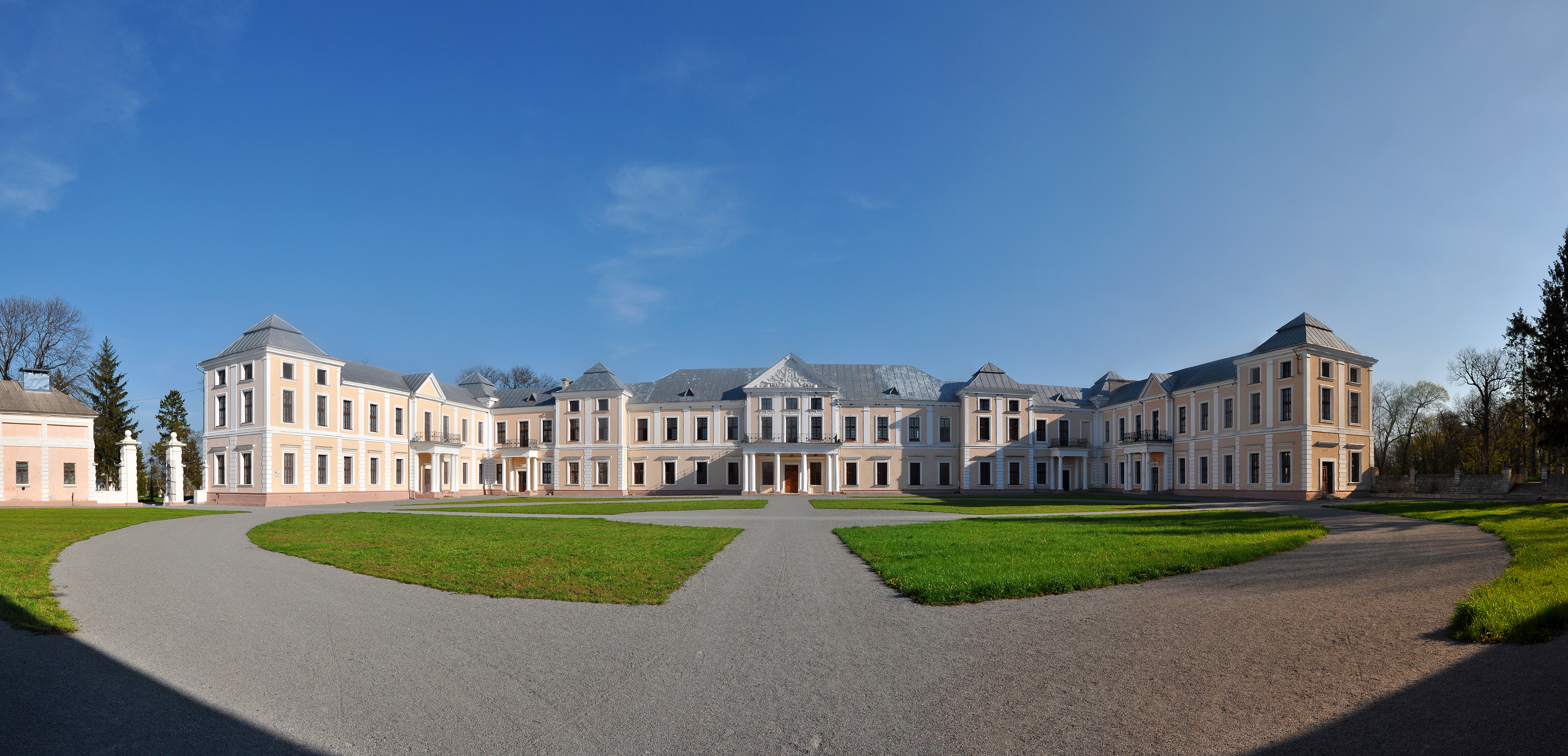
- Vyshnivets Palace

- Coat of arms

- Location of Vyshnivets Vyshnivets (Ukraine)
- Coordinates: 49°54′00″N 25°44′00″E
- Country: Ukraine
- Oblast: Ternopil Oblast
- Raion: Kremenets Raion
- Hromada: Vyshnivets settlement hromada
- First mentioned: 1395
- Town status: 1960

Area
  - Total: 6 km^{2} (2.3 sq mi)

Population (2022)
  - Total: 3,179
  - Density: 530/km^{2} (1,400/sq mi)
- Time zone: UTC+2 (EET)
  - Summer (DST): UTC+3 (EEST)
- Postal code: 47313
- Area code: +380
- Website: gska2.rada.gov.ua:7777/pls/z7502/A005?rdat1=10.03.2007&rf7571=30897

Vyshnivets (Ukrainian: Вишнівець; Polish: Wiśniowiec) is a rural settlement in Kremenets Raion, Ternopil Oblast, western Ukraine. It hosts the administration of Vyshnivets settlement hromada, one of the hromadas of Ukraine. Population: 3,179 (2022 estimate).

Vyshnivets is better known as a family estate of the Polish royal house of Wiśniowiecki (originally Ruthenian princes), which is known for switching from Eastern Orthodoxy to Catholicism (as part of Polonization) as well as the Cossack Hetman Dmytro "Baida" Vyshnevetsky, who established the first Zaporizhian Sich on the island of Small (Mala) Khortytsia on the Dnipro River in 1552 in defense of the lands.

== History ==
=== Early history, to 1939 ===
The area was first mentioned in 1395 soon after annexation of the Kingdom of Galicia-Volhynia by the Kingdom of Poland when the first defensive castle was constructed in the area by Lithuanian duke Kaributas who had acquired the land from the Grand Duke Vytautas the Great.

The town is located on the Horyn River, a right tributary of the Prypiat. Before World War II the village was located in Poland.

The town served as a family seat of the Polish princely Wiśniowiecki family, as of the 15th century, and its name was adopted by the family. The town was noted for its extensive cherry orchards. In the mid-1500s, one of the family's descendants, Dmytro Vyshnevetsky (1516-1563) established the Khortytsia Castle, a Zaporozhian Cossack stronghold on the Little Khortytsia Island. His grandson Jeremi Wiśniowiecki (1612-1651) was also a distinguished military commander. During the time of the leadership of Princes Michael and Valusah Wiśniowiecki, as of 1674, the town was on the verge of becoming a Russian capital.

It was administratively located in the Volhynian Voivodeship in the Lesser Poland Province. The 5th Polish Vanguard Regiment was stationed in Wiśniowiec and its environs in 1792.

Architectural landmarks in the town include a 15th-century Vyshnivets Palace; and palace and park, constructed in the 18th century by the Vyshnevetskyi family.

The town was part of the Wołyń Voivodeship of the Second Polish Republic during the interwar period. Prior to the commencement of World War II, approximately 5,000 Jewish people were residents of the town.

=== World War II ===
Following the joint German-Soviet invasion of Poland, which started World War II in September 1939, the town was occupied by the Soviet Union until 1941. The town was directly in the path of the German invasion of Russia in June 1941, following the repudiation by Germany of the Ribbentrop-Molotov Pact.

On August 11–12, 1942, German troops and Ukrainian Auxiliary Police executed nearly 2,700 Jewish men, women and children. Of those executed, approximately 900 were children. It is estimated that less than 100 of the town's Jewish residents ultimately survived the Holocaust.

In February 1944, the Ukrainian Insurgent Army attacked the monastery of Barefoot Carmelites in Vyshnivets, about 300 people, monks and people who wanted to hide in the monastery were murdered. The identity of 45 murdered people was established, the other victims remain nameless.

=== Post-1945 ===
In 1960, Vyshnivets was changed from the status of a village, to that of an urban-type settlement. The population of the town was 3,469 as of 1994.

Until 18 July 2020, Vyshnivets belonged to Zbarazh Raion. The raion was abolished in July 2020 as part of the administrative reform of Ukraine, which reduced the number of raions of Ternopil Oblast to three. The area of Zbarazh Raion was split between Kremenets and Ternopil Raions, with Vyshnivets being transferred to Kremenets Raion. On 26 January 2024, a new law entered into force which abolished the urban-type settlement status, and Zaliztsi became a rural settlement.

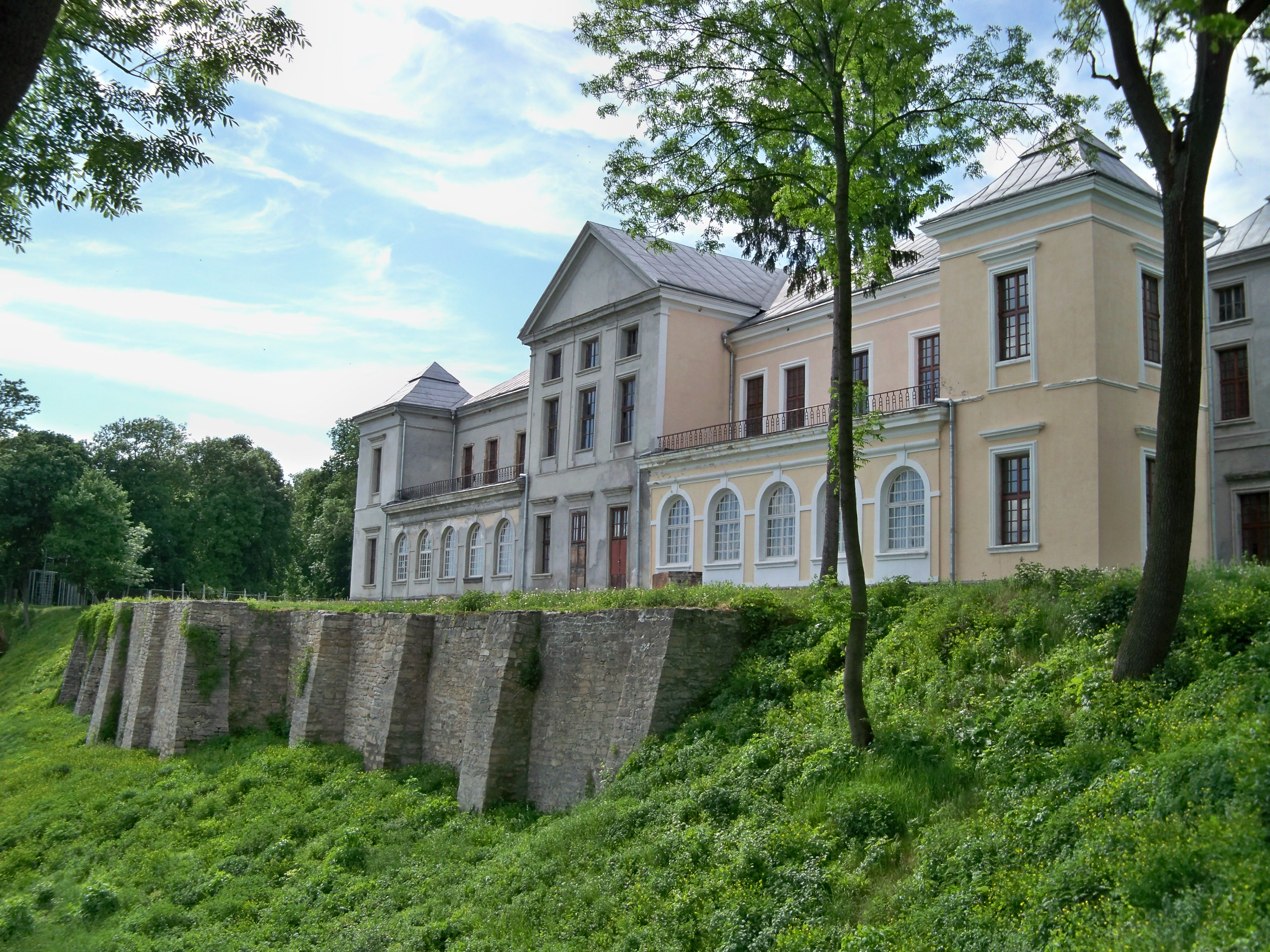
The Wiśniowiecki family palace.

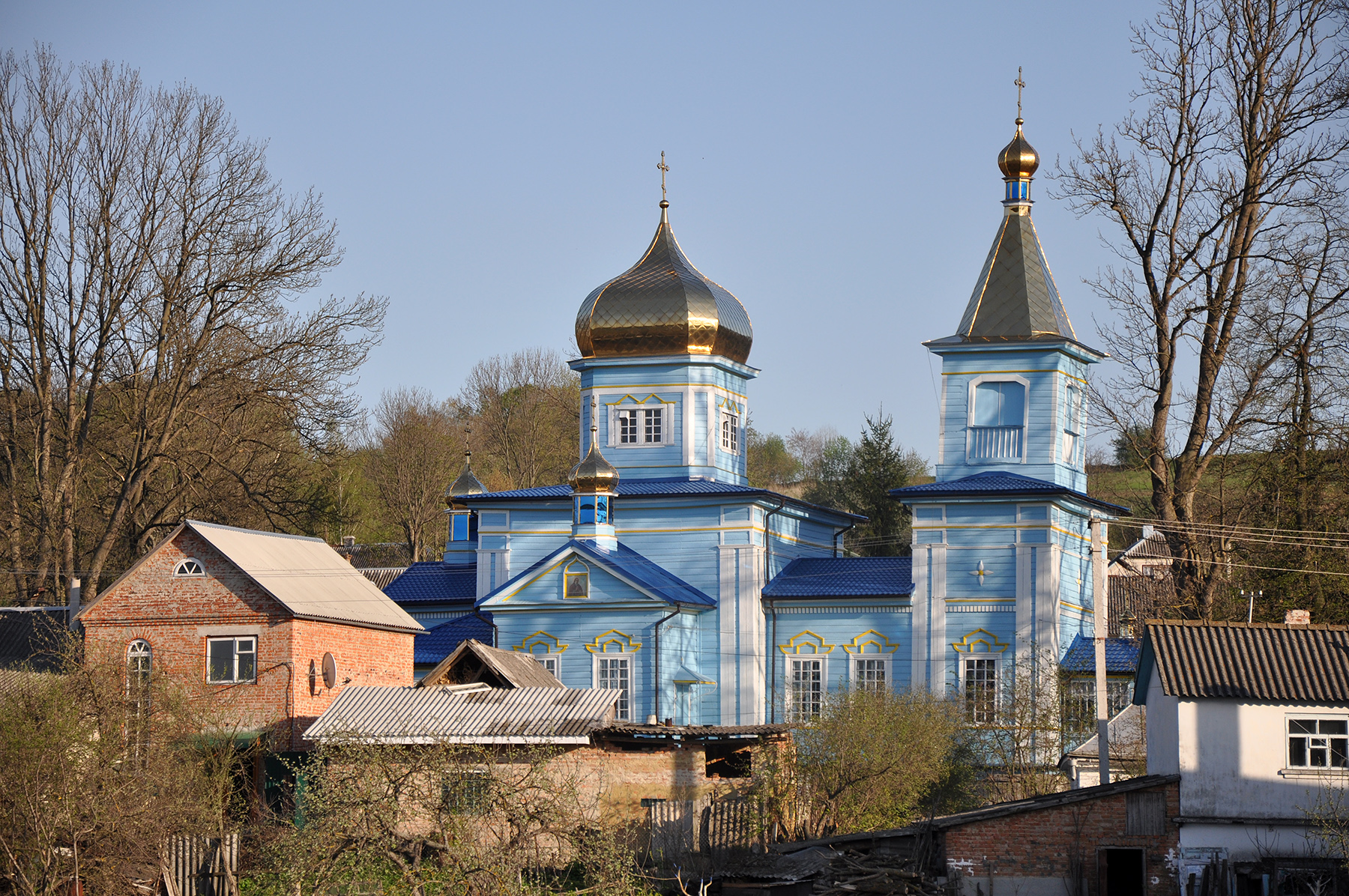
Vyshnivets Church of the Nativity of the Blessed Virgin Mary

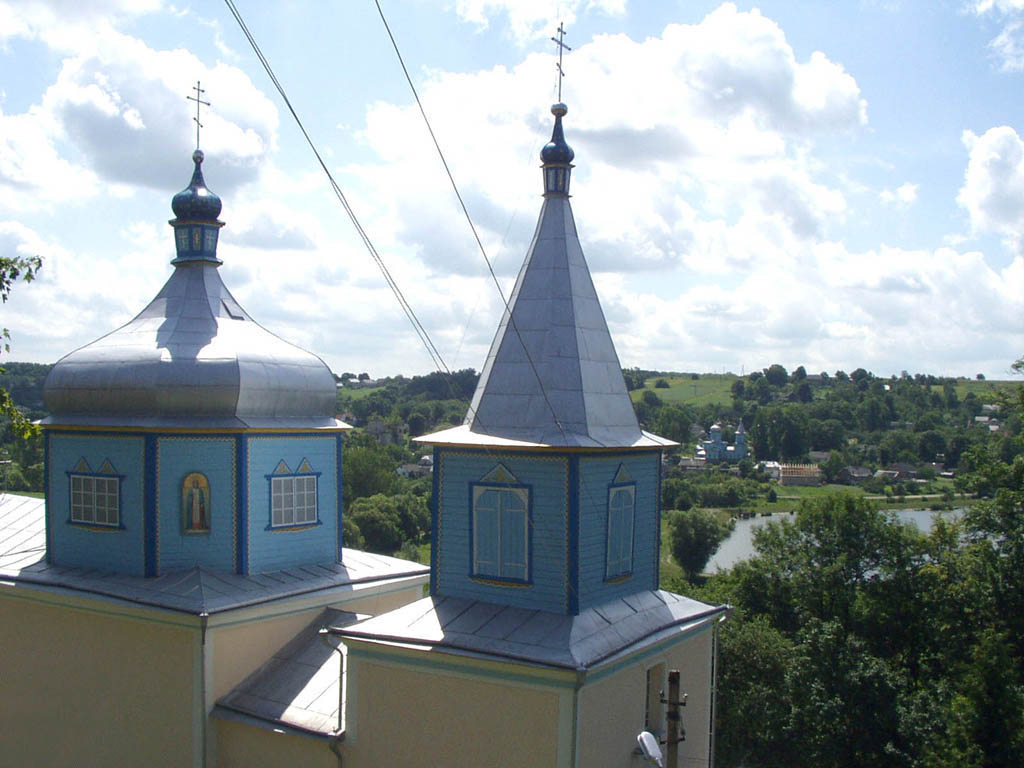
The Voskresenska Church of the town.

== Notable residents ==
- Nataliia Sobkovych (born 1968), Ukrainian artist and art critic

== See also ==
- Wiśniowiec massacres
