= Janusz Wiśniowiecki =

Polish nobleman (1598–1636)

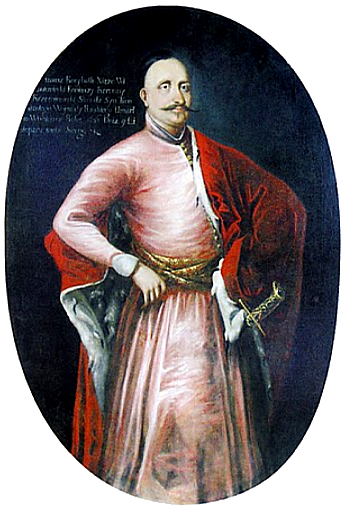

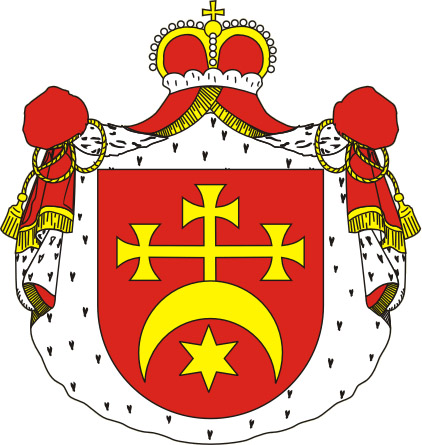
- Coat of arms: Korybut
- Born: 1598
- Died: 1636 (aged 37–38)
- Family: Wiśniowiecki
- Consort: Katarzyna Eugenia Tyszkiewicz
- Issue: Dymitr Jerzy Wiśniowiecki; Konstanty Krzysztof Wiśniowiecki
- Father: Konstanty Wiśniowiecki
- Mother: Anna Zachorowska h. Korczak

Prince Janusz Wiśniowiecki (1598–1636) was a Polish nobleman, koniuszy wielki koronny (i.e. High Royal Equerry) from 1633, and starost of Krzemieniec.

In 1631 after the death of Jerzy Zbaraski, he inherited Puławy.

== Marriage and issue ==
Janusz married Katarzyna Eugenia Tyszkiewicz on 19 September 1627 in Wilno, the daughter of Voivode of Mścisław, Troki and Wilno Janusz Skumin Tyszkiewicz h. Leliwa and had four children:

- Dymitr Jerzy Wiśniowiecki (1631–1682), married Marianna Zamoyska h. Jelita, later Princess Teofila Ludwika Zasławska
- Konstanty Krzysztof Wiśniowiecki (1633–1686), married Urszula Teresa Mniszech, daughter of castellan of Nowy Sącz Franciszek Bernard Mniszech, later Anna Chodorowska h. Korczak
- Anna Wiśniowiecka
- Barbara Katarzyna Wiśniowiecka

== Legacy ==
Samuel Twardowski, a 17th-century Polish poet and writer, wrote an epic Książę Wiśniowiecki Janusz (or Prince Janusz Wiśniowiecki).

== Bibliography ==
- Ilona Czamańska: Wiśniowieccy. Monografia rodu. Poznań: Wydawnictwo Poznańskie, 2007, ISBN 83-7177-229-7.
