= Janusz Tyszkiewicz =

Janusz Tyszkiewicz may refer to:

- Janusz Skumin Tyszkiewicz, 1570–1642, voivode of Mścisław (1621–1626), Trakai (1626–1640), and Vilnius (1640–1642)
- Janusz Tyszkiewicz Łohojski, 1590–1649, voivode of Kiev
