= Dymitr Jerzy Wiśniowiecki =

Polish magnate (1631–1682)

- Prince
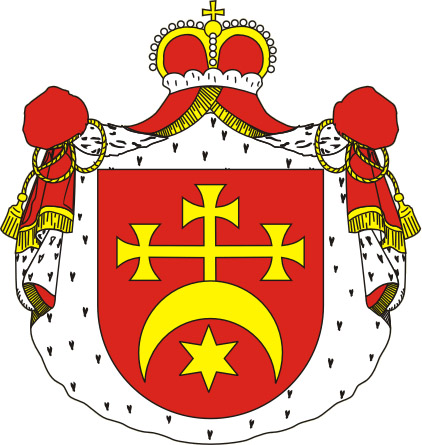
- Coat of arms: Korybut
- Full name: Dymitr Jerzy ks. Wiśniowiecki h. Korybut
- Born: 9 December 1631; Wisniowiec
- Died: 28 July 1682 (aged 50); Lublin
- Family: Wiśniowiecki
- Consort: Marianna Zamoyska; Teofilia Ludwika Zasławska
- Issue: with Marianna Zamoyska; Zofia Wiśniowiecka; Eugenia Katarzyna Wiśniowiecka
- Father: Janusz Wisniowiecki
- Mother: Katarzyna Eugenia Tyszkiewicz

Prince Dymitr Jerzy Wiśniowiecki (1631–1682) was a Polish magnate and szlachcic. Great Guard of the Crown from 1658, Field Hetman of the Crown from 1668, Great Crown Hetman from 1676, voivode of Belz 1660–1678 and Kraków 1678–1681, and castellan of Kraków from 1681. He was starost of Biala Cerkiew, Krzemieniec, Solec, Kamionka Strumilowa, Braha and Luboml.

After several years of study at the Academy of Kraków, he took part in the war against the insurgents of Bohdan Khmelnytsky and participated in the battles of Zbarazh in 1649, Beresteczko in 1651, Żwaniec in 1653 and Ochmatów in 1655.

In the first period of the Swedish "Deluge" he was commander of Husarian and Pancerni squadrons in the Battle of Wojnicz on 2 October 1655, but soon change the sides and served under Charles X Gustav. In February 1656 he returned to the Army of the Crown and fought in the rank of a pułkownik of the cavalry in the Battle of Warsaw.

In 1657 he participated in the battles against George Rakoczy II and the Siege of Toruń in 1658. In 1660 during the Ukrainian campaign, he participated in the battles of Cudnów and Lubar.

In the Polish–Cossack–Tatar War of 1666–71 he participated in the battles of Bracław, Bar and Mohyłów. In the Battle of Chocim on 11 November 1673, he commanded a regiment of cavalry. During the Royal election of 1674, he supported the candidacy of Prince Charles of Lorraine for the Polish throne. In 1676 he was promoted to Grand Hetman of the Crown.

== Marriage and issue ==
Dymitr Jerzy married Marianna Zamoyska, daughter of podstoli of Lwów Zdzisław Jan Zamoyski h. Jelita and had two children:

- Zofia Wisniowiecka (1655-1681), married voivode of Podlasie Wacław Leszczyński h. Wieniawa
- Eugenia Katarzyna Wisniowiecka (died ca. 1681), married voivode of Podole Stanisław Koniecpolski h. Pobóg

His second wife was Princess Teofila Ludwika Zasławska, daughter of Prince Władysław Dominik Zasławski, niece of King Jan III Sobieski.
