= Krzysztof Zbaraski =

Polish–Lithuanian noble (1580–1627)

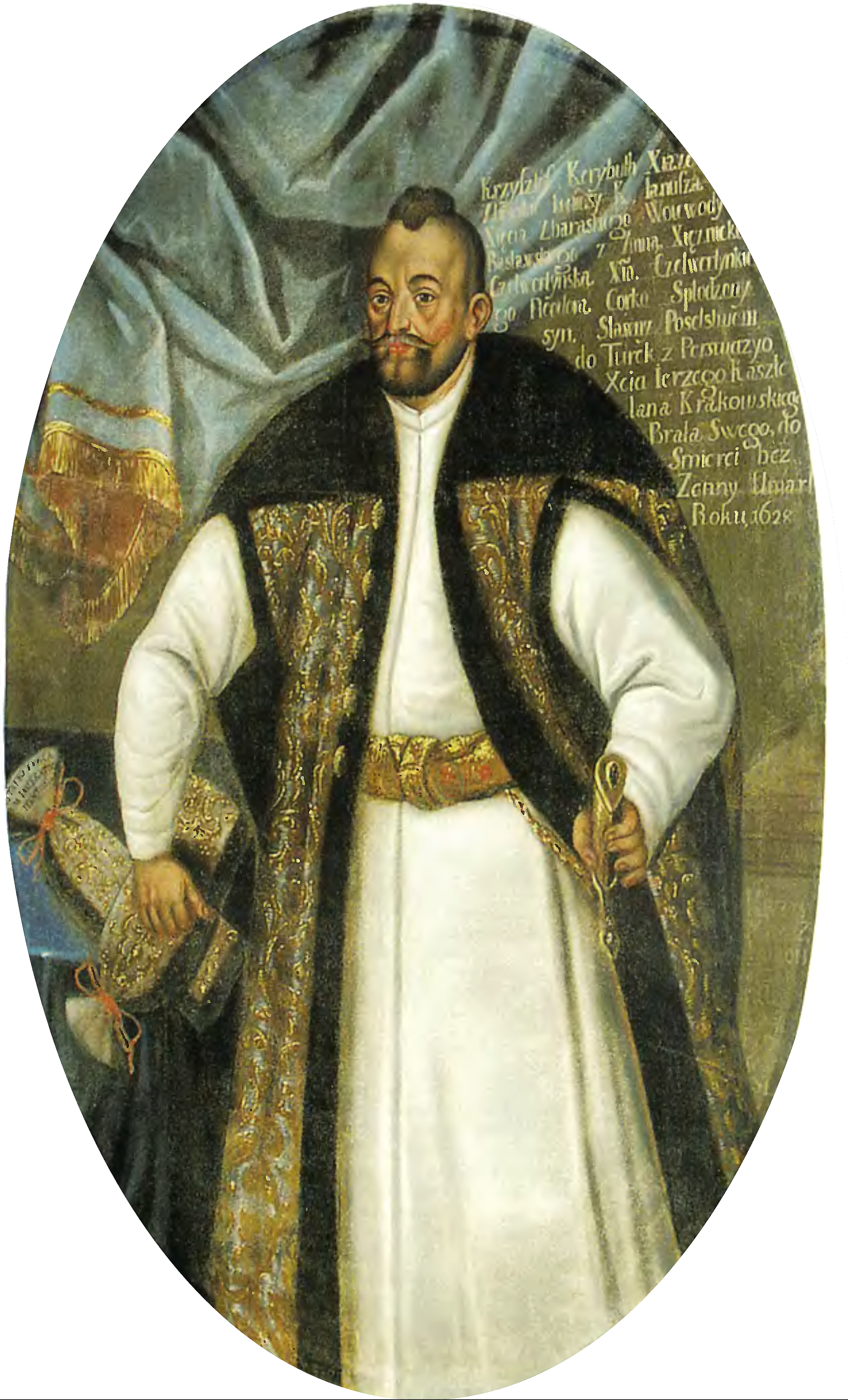
- Coat of arms: Korybut
- Born: 1580
- Died: March 3, 1627
- Family: Zbaraski
- Father: Janusz Zbaraski
- Mother: Anna Czetwertyńska

Prince Krzysztof Zbaraski (Polish: Krzysztof Zbaraski; Ukrainian: Христофор Збаразький; 1580 – 6 March 1627) was a Polish–Lithuanian member of the gentry social class (szlachta). During his life he was a Master of the Stables of the Crown (or koniuszy koronny), a member of special committee for Cossacks and tariffs, a skilled diplomat, and a politician of the Polish–Lithuanian Commonwealth. He was Starost of Kremenets, Wiślica, Hrubieszów and Bolesławiec.

Zbaraski served as Commonwealth ambassador to the Ottoman Empire from 1622 to 1624. His diplomatic mission's entry to Constantinople was famous for its display of wealth. Zbaraski paid most of the mission's costs. For 30,000 talars, the mission ransomed prisoners from battle of Cecora, including Stanisław Koniecpolski. The mission was described in 1633 in the diary of the mission's secretary, Samuel Twardowski Przewazna legacja JO Ksiazecia Krzysztofa Zbaraskiego (The Important Mission of His Grace Duke Krzysztof Zbaraski).

Krzysztof Zbaraski was buried in Cracow.

Zbaraski was the brother of Jerzy Zbaraski (who died in 1631 as last of the Zbaraski family). He sponsored the Jesuit collegium in Vinnytsia.
