= Korybut coat of arms =

Polish coat of arms

Korybut
- Cities: Wiśniowiec
- Families: 13 names Galiński, Korybut, Łahiszyński, Nikitinicz, Purycki, Wiśniowiecki, Woroniecki, Woroniecki Korybut, Woroniecki ze Zbaraża, Zbaraski, Zbarazki, Zdanowicz, Żdanowicz

Korybut is a Polish coat of arms. It was used by the Princely House of Wiśniowiecki-Zbaraski and several branches of the House of Nieświcki in the times of the Polish–Lithuanian Commonwealth.

== Notable bearers ==
Notable bearers of this coat of arms include:

- House of Wiśniowiecki
  - Dymitr "Bajda" Wiśniowiecki (leader of the Ukrainian Cossacks, Hetman of the Registered Cossacks.
  - Janusz Wiśniowiecki (Master of the Stables of the Crown.)
  - Dymitr Jerzy Wiśniowiecki (Great Guard and Hetman of the Crown, voivode of Belz and Kraków)
  - Janusz Antoni Wisniowiecki
  - Jeremi Wiśniowiecki (Prince at Wiśniowiec, Łubny and Chorol, Palatine of Ruthenia.)
  - Michał Korybut Wiśniowiecki (King of the Polish–Lithuanian Commonwealth 1669–1673.)
  - Michał Serwacy Wiśniowiecki (Hetman, Castellan and Voivode of Vilnius, Great Chancellor of Lithuania)
- House of Zbaraski
  - Krzysztof Zbaraski (Master of the Stables of the Crown, diplomat and a politician.)
  - Jerzy Zbaraski (Krajczy and Podczaszy of the Crown, Castellan of Kraków.)

== Gallery ==
Coat of arms of King Michał Korybut Wiśniowiecki

Grabowski IX Hrabia, a variation of Zbiświcz (Parted quarterly with an inescutcheon: Zbiświcz – Korybut/Turno/Wierzbna/Nałęcz). Coat of Arms of Count Józef Ignacy Goetzendorf-Grabowski and Count Józef Grabowski (Prussia)

Daszkiewicz family (Prussia)

== See also ==
- Polish heraldry
- Heraldic family
- List of Polish nobility coats of arms

== Bibliography ==
- Bartosz Paprocki: Herby rycerstwa polskiego na pięcioro ksiąg rozdzielone, Kraków, 1584.
- Tadeusz Gajl: Herbarz polski od średniowiecza do XX wieku : ponad 4500 herbów szlacheckich 37 tysięcy nazwisk 55 tysięcy rodów. L&L, 2007. ISBN 978-83-60597-10-1.
