= Skumin =

- Leliwa – Skumin

Origin
- Language: Greek
- Region of origin: Grand Duchy of Lithuania, Polish–Lithuanian Commonwealth, Russian Empire

The Skumin family (Russian: Ску́мин, IPA: [ˈskumʲɪn]) is a prominent Lithuanian, Polish and Russian noble family.

== Notable people with the surname ==
- Alexander Skumin (1748–1775), statesman of the Polish–Lithuanian Commonwealth
- Andrew N. Skumin (1909–1984), Colonel of Joustice, WWII Veteran, officer of MGB of the USSR, Chairman of the Military Tribunal of the Internal Troops of the Volga Military District
- Janusz Skumin (1570–1642), Polish nobleman and politician
- Jerzy Skumin (1596–1656), religious leader and statesman of the Grand Duchy of Lithuania
- Katarzyna Eugenia Skumina (1610–1648), Polish noble lady
- Ludwik Skumin (1748–1808), Field Lithuanian Hetman (Grand Treasurer) of Polish-Lithuanian Commonwealth. He received the Russian Orders of St. Alexander Nevsky and of St. Andrew
- Victor A. Skumin (born 1948), Russian scientist, philosopher and writer

== Gallery ==
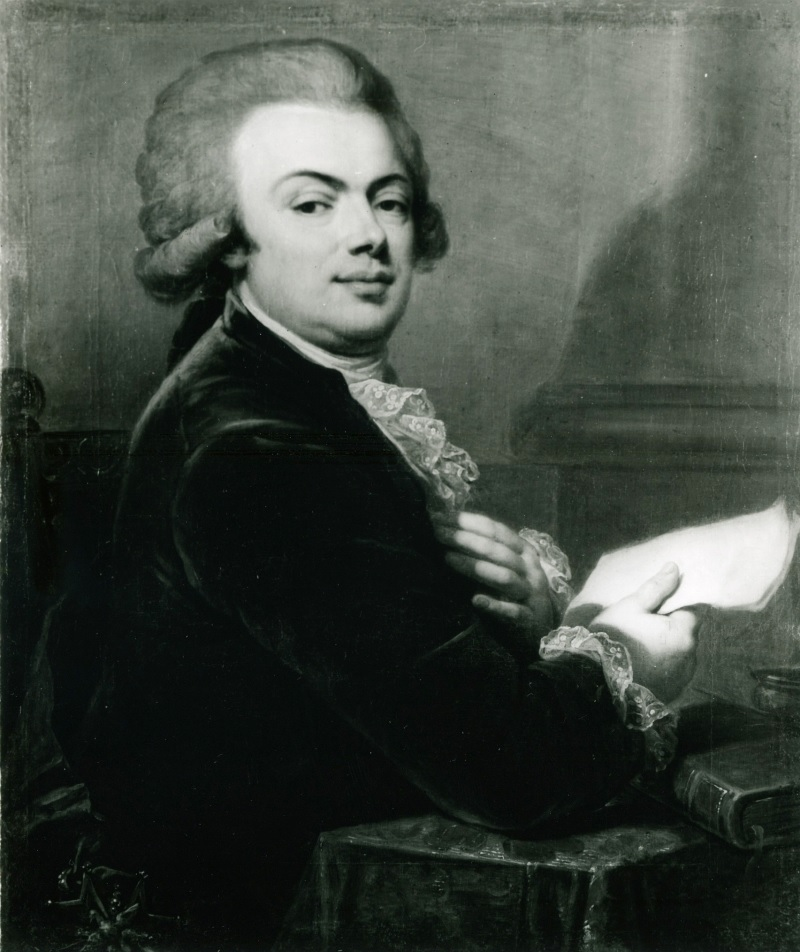
Ludvik Skumin

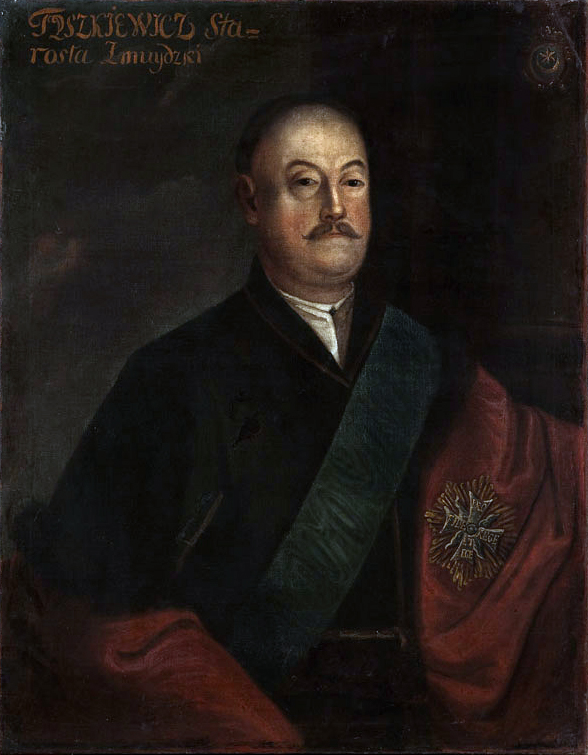
Jozef Skumin

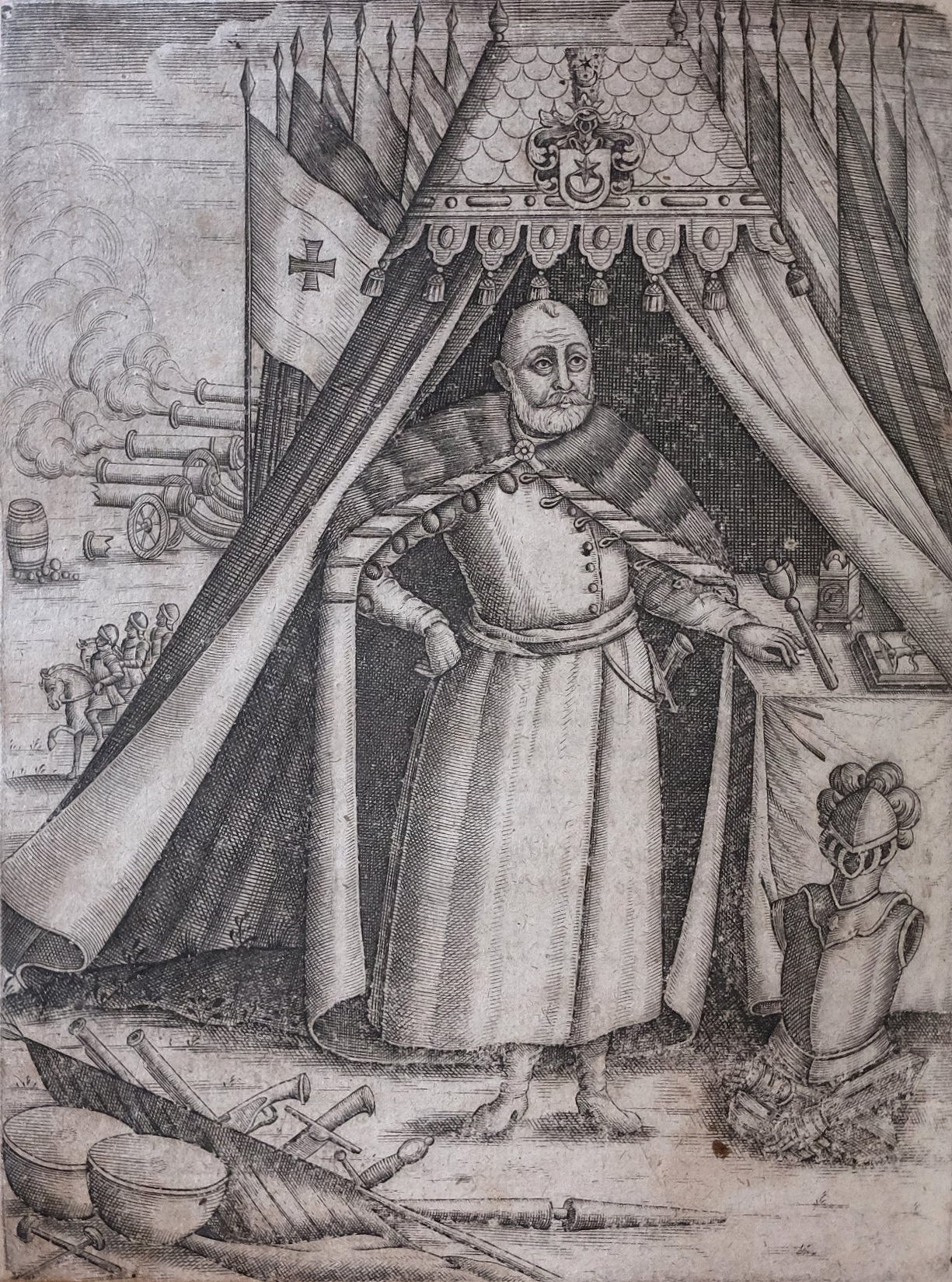
Janusz Skumin

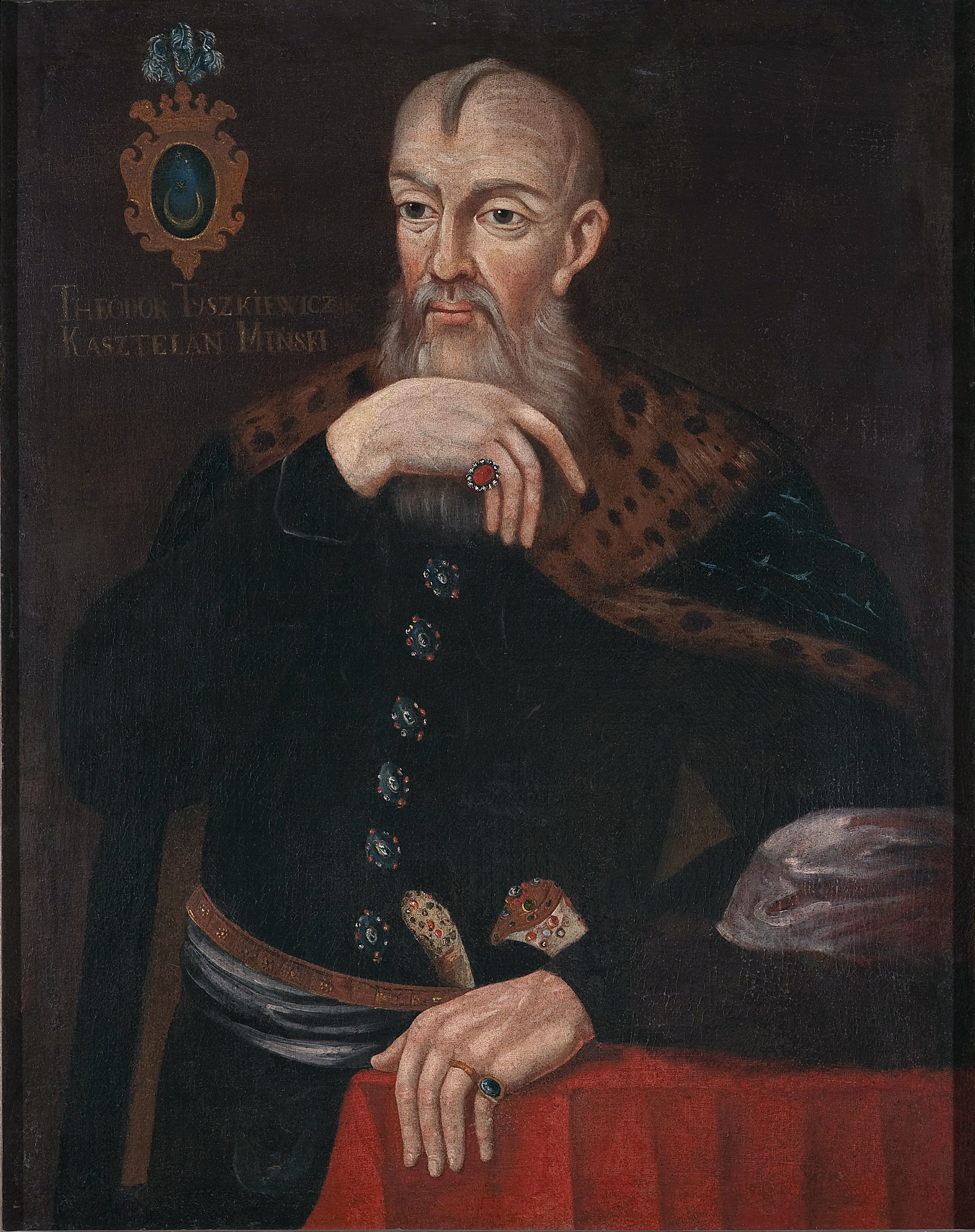
Theodor Skumin

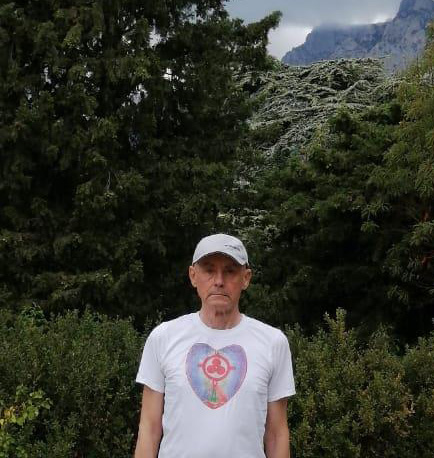
Victor Skumin
