= Victor Skumin =

Russian scientist, writer, philosopher

Victor Skumin Виктор Андреевич Скумин
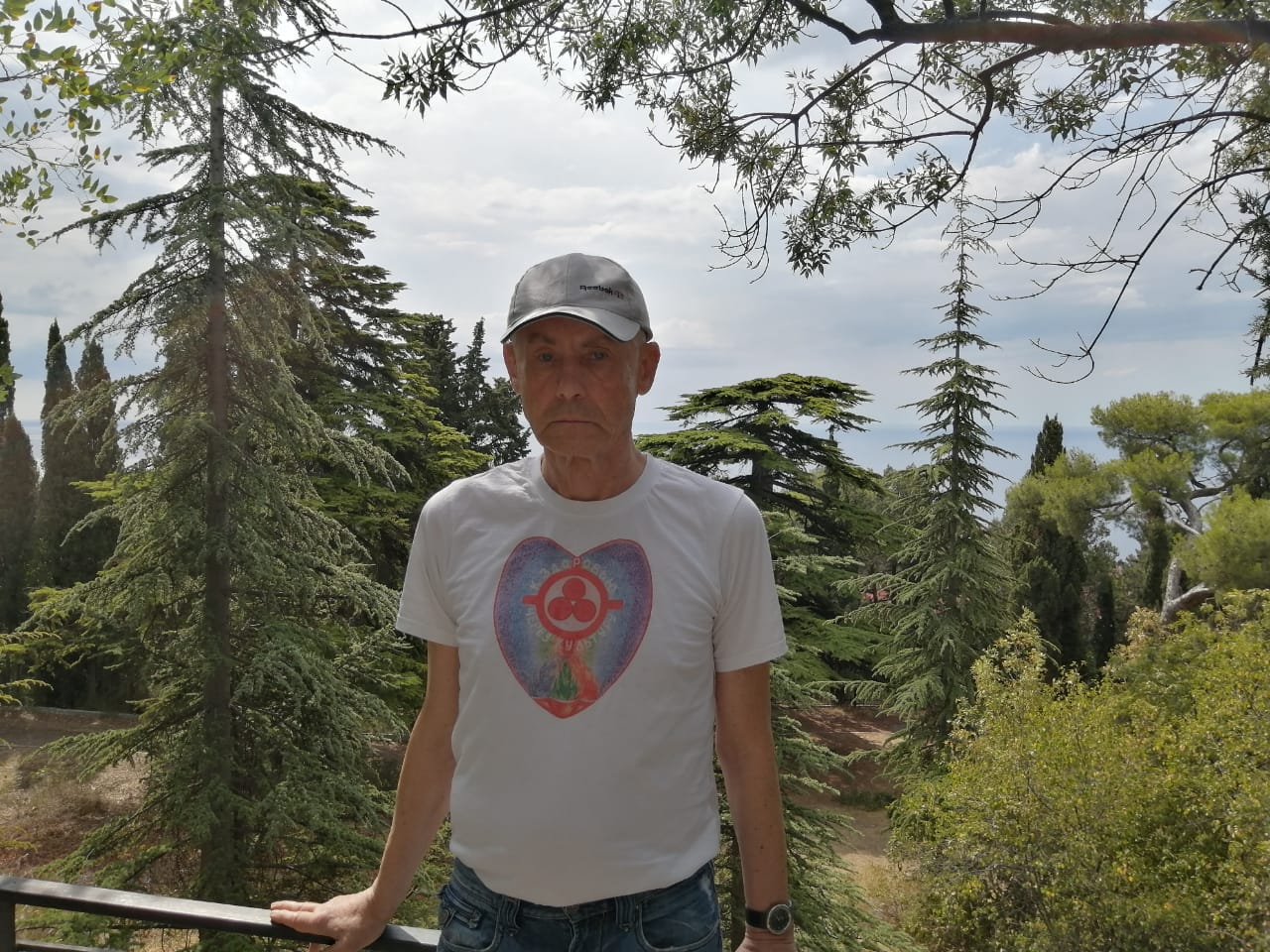
- Victor Skumin in 2020
- Born: 30 August 1948 (age 78); Pensa Oblast, RSFSR, Soviet Union
- Education: Kharkiv National Medical University
- Known for: Skumin syndrome
- Scientific career
- Fields: Psychiatry, psychotherapy, psychology, philosophy
- Workplaces: Kiev Institute of Cardiovascular Surgery (ru), Kharkiv Medical Academy of Post-graduate Education, Kharkiv State Academy of Culture, The World Organisation of Culture of Health (Moscow)
- Doctoral advisor: Nikolai Amosov
- Website: biblmdkz.ru/skumin.html

Victor Andreevich Skumin (Russian: Ви́ктор Андре́евич Ску́мин, IPA: [ˈvʲiktər ɐnˈdrʲejɪvʲɪtɕ ˈskumʲɪn], born 30 August 1948) is a Russian and Soviet scientist, psychiatrist, philosopher and writer.

After graduating from the Kharkiv National Medical University in 1973, he became a psychotherapist in Kiev Institute of Cardiovascular Surgery. In 1978, he described a new disease, the Skumin syndrome. He introduced a method of psychotherapy and self-improvement based on optimistic autosuggestion for psychological rehabilitation of cardiosurgical patients (1979).

From 1980 to 1990, he was professor of psychotherapy at the Kharkiv Medical Academy of Post-graduate Education. The main result of his scientific activity was the discovery of the "syndrome of the neurotic phantom of somatic disease" and a "concept of the mental constituent of a chronic somatic disease".

From 1990 to 1994, Skumin held positions as chaired professor of psychology and pedagogy, and of physical education and Health life at the Kharkiv State Academy of Culture. In 1994, he was elected to the post of the President-founder of the World Organisation of Culture of Health (Moscow). In 1995, Skumin became the first editor-in-chief of the journal To Health via Culture. He is known for inventing a popular term "Culture of Health" (1968).

Besides psychiatry and psychology, Skumin writes on healthy lifestyle, yoga, and philosophy. He co-authored series of illustrated books and articles on Agni Yoga, Roerichism, Russian cosmism, transhumanism, and New Age. He wrote books of fiction and lyrics for several songs.

== Early life and education ==
Victor Skumin was born on 30 August 1948 in Penza Oblast, RSFSR, where his father – Andrew Skumin (Russian: Андре́й Ску́мин, IPA: [ɐnˈdrʲej ˈskumʲɪn]) – was an officer of MGB of the USSR. He was the Colonel of Justice, WWII Veteran. After the birth of Victor, the family moved to the city of Kazan, where his father was appointed to the post of Chairman of the Military Tribunal of the Internal Troops of the Volga Military District.

The family many times moved from one city to another, where Andrew Skumin was appointed to a new post. These cities, in particular, were Penza, Chelyabinsk, and Petrozavodsk. For this reason, he studied in various educational institutions.

Skumin studied medicine at the Kharkiv National Medical University. The history of the higher medical school in Kharkiv is more than 200 years long and closely connected with the history of Vasily Karazin Kharkiv National University, because it sprang from its Medical Faculty. The university – one of the oldest University of the Russian Empire and the Soviet Union – was founded in 1804, a decree about its foundation was signed by the Emperor of Russia Alexander I, and the first Statutes of the university were approved at that time. In the Kharkiv University were laid high scientific standards. Its history is connected with the names of the Nobel Laureates – Lev Landau, Simon Kuznets, Élie Metchnikoff – and other distinguished scientists.

Skumin graduated the Medical University in 1973 with diploma with honours. In 1968, when he was still a medical student, he proposed the term Culture of Health (Russian: Культу́ра Здоро́вья), which has become widespread. The main task of a Culture of Health is to implement innovative health programs that support a holistic approach to physical, mental and spiritual well-being.

Victor Skumin is married. He has two sons.

== Contribution to psychiatry and psychotherapy ==
=== Cardiac surgery ===
Skumin researched from 1976 to 1980 psychological and psychiatric problems of cardiac surgery under the mentorship of Nikolai Amosov, who was the founder and first director of the Kiev Institute of Cardiovascular Surgery. This Institute was the first to conduct surgical treatment of heart diseases in the Ukrainian SSR (since 1955), the Institute began to conduct operations with extracorporeal circulation (1958), and mitral valve replacements (1963). In 1961, Amosov was awarded Lenin Prize for the work of surgery.

Since a valve replacement is a heart surgical procedure, it requires placing the patient on cardiopulmonary bypass. With a valve replacement surgery, there are some risks. Skumin researched a neuropsychological and psychopathologic changes following open heart surgery, nonpsychotic mental disorders in patients with valvular heart disease before and after surgery, associated with mechanical artificial heart valve (MHV) implant.

An artificial heart valve is a device implanted in the heart of a patient with valvular heart disease, congenital heart defect, etc. When one or two of the four heart valves malfunctions, the medical choice may be to replace the natural valve with an artificial valve. There are three major types of mechanical valves with many modifications on these designs. This requires open heart surgery. The mechanical valves are made from metal and pyrolytic carbon, and can last a lifetime. All MHV function in the human body creating a unique sound effects and vibration. Patients with mechanical valves must take blood-thinning medications to prevent clotting. The choice of which valve type to use depends upon the patient's age, medical condition, preferences with medication, and lifestyle.

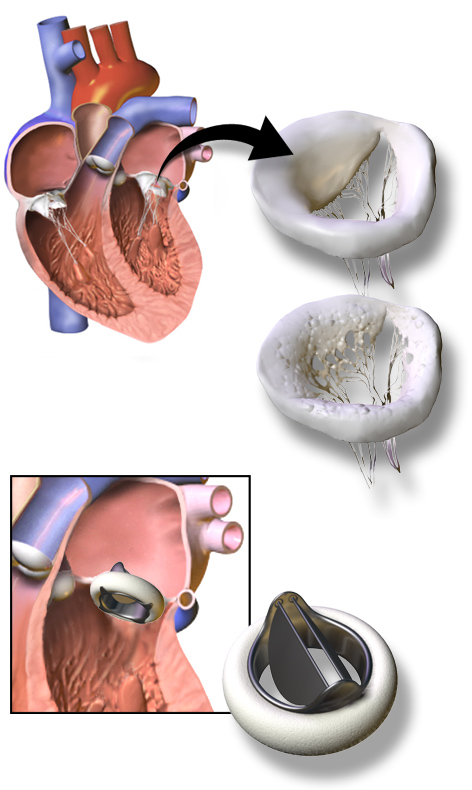
3D rendering of Mechanical Valve (St. Francis model)

Skumin syndrome (Russian: Синдро́м Ску́мина) was described by Skumin in 1978. as a cardioprosthetic psychopathological syndrome, associated with mechanical heart valve implant and manifested by irrational fear, anxiety, depression and sleep disorder. This syndrome is often accompanied by asthenia. Alain Carpentier – a member of the French Academy of Sciences and the head the Department of Cardiovascular Surgery at the Hôpital Européen Georges-Pompidou in Paris – believed in 2011 that Skumin syndrome develops in a quarter of the patients with an artificial heart valve. It is possible that a similar problem arises in the conduct of operations to implement an artificial heart.

The Russia's international news agency RIA Novosti, operating under the purview of the Russian Ministry of Communications and Mass Media, wrote about this problem (2014),

Victor Skumin, our domestic scientist, described "cardioprosthetic psychopathologic syndrome", which entered the textbooks as "Skumin syndrome". The human mind is constantly fixed on the motor is running. For example, in contrast to prosthetic of teeth, arms or legs, it is not possible to divert attention of human from the sounds of functioning implant in his body. Person is constantly waiting for a suddenly the motor will stop? In the human heart the pain gives signals. Here there is no pain and can not to be. In the future, probably, there will be heart prostheses, imitating his heartbeat. But they will not be hurt, and Skumin syndrome will continue to hang over the human psyche with a heart valve prosthesis.

The methods and the main principles of such therapy and neuropsychological rehabilitation are described and its efficacy was demonstrated. Skumin proposed mixture subsequently named after him. Skumin's mixture (Russian: Миксту́ра Ску́мина) is a medicine with a sedative effect, affecting the central nervous system. It is used to treat Skumin syndrome, light forms of heart failure, anxiety and sleep disorders, and asthenia. The medicine is known to be well tolerated, with no contra-indications, except sensitivity. The formula contains Adonis vernalis, Crataegus, Valerian root, Leonurus cardiaca, Eucalyptus, Peppermint, and Rose hip.

For psychological rehabilitation, Skumin improved psychological function by calming the nervous system, enhancing relaxation, increasing body awareness and decreasing general anxiety.

In 1979, Skumin created a special modification of mind control method for psychological rehabilitation of cardiosurgical patients. This method is based on autogenic training. Autogenic training is a relaxation technique developed by the psychiatrist Johannes Heinrich Schultz. He emphasized parallels to techniques in yoga and meditation. It is a method for influencing one's autonomic nervous system. The technique involves the daily practice of sessions that last around 15 minutes, usually in the morning, at lunch time, and in the evening. During each session, the practitioner will repeat a set of visualisations that induce a state of relaxation. Each session can be practiced in a position chosen amongst a set of recommended postures.

The technique of the Skumin mind control method (Russian: Психотре́нинг по Ску́мину) involves the use of two standard postures: sitting meditation and lying down meditation. This method of psychotraining includes five psychological exercises: the first is "the relaxation", the second one is "the warming", the third one is "the zero gravity", the fourth one is "the target autosuggestion", and the fifth exercise is "the psychological activation". Each session contain explanation of the theory and practice of each new exercise as it is reached. The therapeutic effect is achieved by the neutralization of traumatic emotional experiences and the progressive reorganization of the psychic structures to include previously unacceptable mental contents, too. This method of psychotherapy has found application in medical practice, in particular in the treatment of phobias, headaches, etc.

Skumin's priority on the description of this syndrome and the establishment of effective methods of treatment and rehabilitation of cardiosurgical patients confirmed Nikolai Amosov and Yakov Bendet, Alain Carpentier, and many others. The Higher Attestation Commission under the USSR Council of Ministers awarded him for this research study the degree of Candidate of Sciences (1980). It is a first post-graduate scientific degree in some former Eastern Bloc countries.

=== Gastroenterology ===
From 1980 to 1990, he worked as professor of psychotherapy at the Kharkiv Medical Academy of Post-graduate Education. During this period Skumin investigated mental health disorder in chronic diseases of the digestive system in children and adolescents.

A most significant life event in the first years of life is a disease, especially if it is of early onset, severe, life-threatening, with an uncertain prognosis, and with the necessity of frequent diagnostic and therapeutic interventions. Psychological implications are a significant part of the illness, not a marginal component; they can affect prognosis and outcome. Various laboratory tests, physical examinations, and surgeries on these individuals show no evidence supporting the idea that these exaggerating symptoms are present.

In particular, Skumin studied the patients, aged from 6 to 17, suffering from diseases of the gastrointestinal tract. Most of them have revealed a negative psychological attitude to the dietotherapy they received. A system of special measures has been developed including three main elements: (1) psychotherapeutic mediation of dietotherapy before its administration and in the process of the therapy; (2) creation of the psychologic attitude to the diet adherence; (3) alteration of the patient's taste stereotype. Realization of such measures has been conducive to higher effectiveness of the dietotherapy.

Based on studies into the mental sphere of gastroenterological patients, he systematized borderline neurotic and personality disorders on the clinical and etiopathogenetic basis. He studied the psychosocial problems that may affect children or teenagers who have the chronic gastrointestinal disease. A system of measures aimed at early diagnosis, correction, therapy and prophylaxis of borderline conditions and psychosocial readaptation of patients is scientifically based. The main result of his scientific activity was the discovery of the "syndrome of the neurotic phantom of somatic disease" (a specific psychopathological complex of symptoms) and a "concept of the mental constituent of a chronic somatic disease".

Skumin defended his doctoral thesis in Moscow at the Serbsky State Scientific Center for Social and Forensic Psychiatry (1988). The Higher Attestation Commission awarded him for this research study the degree of Doktor Nauk in Medicine (Doctor of Medical Sciences – Dr.scient.med.). It is a higher doctoral degree which may be earned after the Candidate of Sciences (which is informally regarded in Russia and many other post-Soviet states as equivalent to PhD obtained in countries in which PhD is not the highest academic degree).

== Culture of Health, Agni Yoga and Theosophy ==
The Culture of Health is the basic science about Spiritual Humanity. It studies the perspectives of harmonious development of Spiritual man and Spiritual ethnos as a conscious creator of the State of Light into the territory of the Solar System.

— Victor Skumin

From 1990 to 1994, Skumin held positions as Professor by the Chair of Psychology and Pedagogy, and Professor by the Chair of Physical Education and Health life at the Kharkiv State Academy of Culture. Skumin completed research of theoretical and practical issues of culture of health, which he developed throughout his scientific and pedagogical activity. These methods, he has introduced in the training course for the students of the academy: The Foundations of a Culture of Health. His scientific and pedagogical work Skumin combine with a social activity. In 1994, he was elected to the post of the President-founder of the World Organisation of Culture of Health (WOCH) — International social movement "To Health via Culture" (Russian: Междунаро́дное обще́ственное Движе́ние «К Здоро́вью че́рез Культу́ру). Coat of arms of the WOCH contain a symbol of Roerichism.

The organization operates in accordance with the registered in Ministry of Justice of the Russian Federation Charter. Key element of a Culture of Health is implement innovative health programs that support a holistic approach to physical, mental and spiritual well-being both inside and outside the workplace.

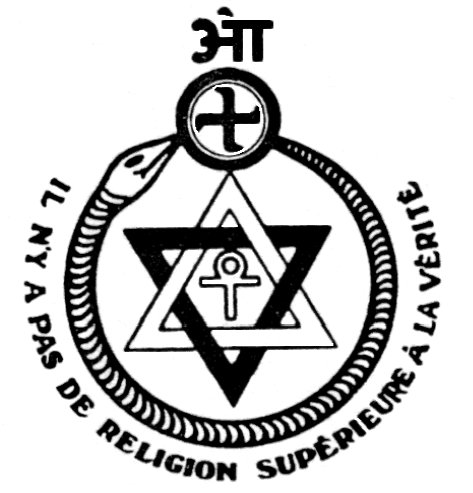
Symbol of Theosophy incorporated the Swastika, Star of David, Ankh, Aum and Ouroboros symbols

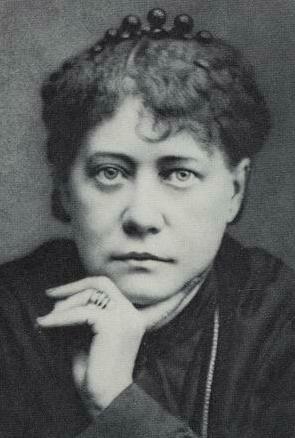
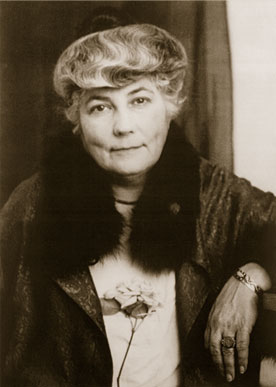
Two philosophers greatly influenced the New Age movement: Helena Blavatsky and Helena Roerich
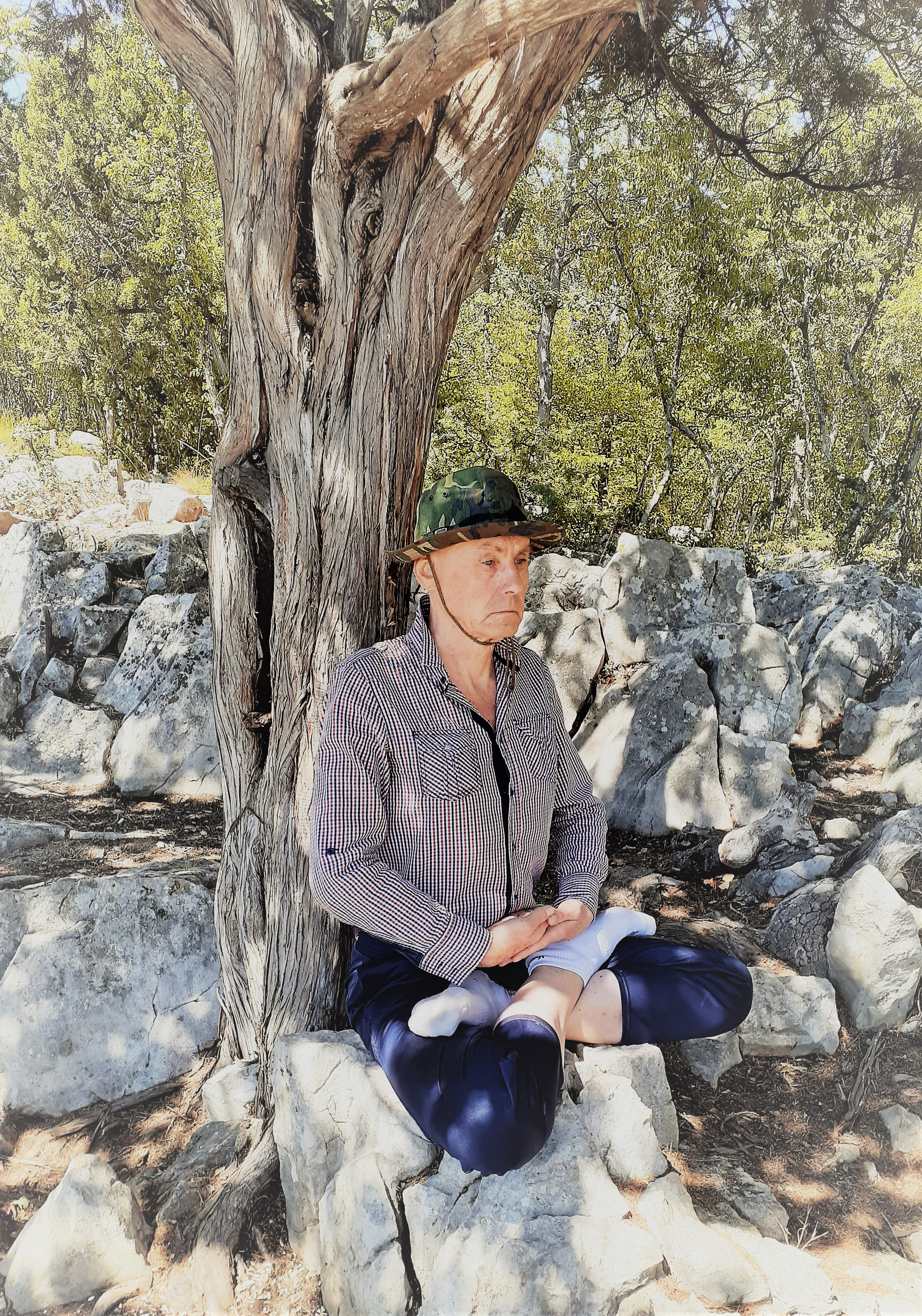
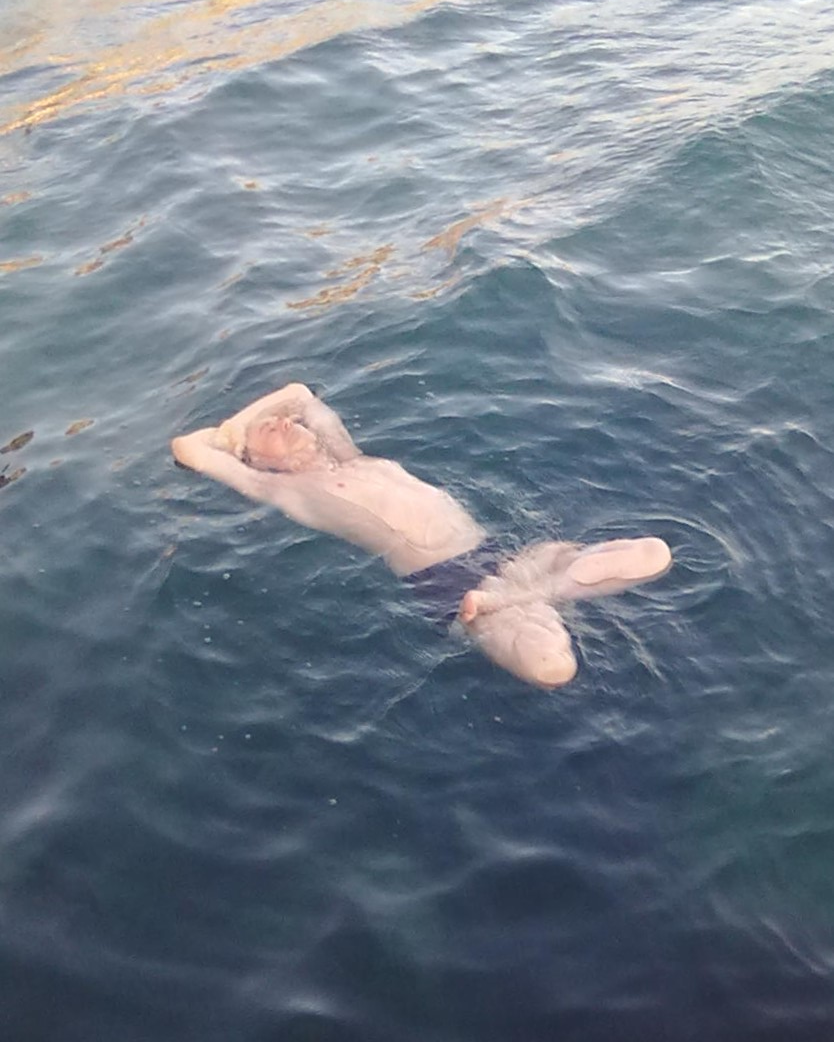
Victor Skumin at the age of 72. Yoga asanas

In the Russian Orthodox Church the social activities of this international organization qualifies as an ideology of the Living Ethics and New Age (NA),

The ideology of the NA serves outstanding contemporary philosophers: Gregory Bateson, Ken Wilber, Paul Feyerabend. On a grand scale is the creation and support of international organizations, contained in the ideology of the NA. In Russia and in Ukraine, International movement "To Health via Culture", based on the teachings of Agni Yoga, operates and has a great publishing activity.

The relationship between the Skumin's doctrine and Roerichism is also confirmed by some scientists, such as Goraschuk V. P., Professor of H.S. Skovoroda Kharkiv National Pedagogical University. In 2004, he wrote in his thesis for a Doctor's degree on speciality "general pedagogics and history of pedagogics",

V. Skumìn developed the problems associated with a culture of health in the context of philosophy of Roerich.

Agni Yoga is a philosophical teaching which embraces all sides of being—from cosmological problems, down to daily human life. This teaching is based on the books written by Helena and Nicholas Roerich in the first half of the 20th century. The New Age movement is a spiritual movement that developed in Western nations during the 1970s. The movement is characterised by a holistic view of the cosmos, a belief in an emergent Age of Aquarius an emphasis on self-spirituality and the authority of the self, a focus on healing (particularly with alternative therapies).

Professor Verhorubova and professor Lobanova from Tomsk State Pedagogical University argued (2012) that in accordance with the concept of a culture of health, proposed by Skumin, the culture – spiritual, mental, and physical – determines the status of human health. And health – spiritual, mental, physical – is a prerequisite for achieving a higher level of culture.

The essence of the teachings of the culture of health, reveals professor of University of Luhansk N. Gribok. He wrote at 2009,

Russian Professor Skumin insists on the fact that the culture of health should be considered as an integral part of the spiritual culture and the moral culture, culture of labour and culture of recreation, culture of personality and culture of relationships. According to the scientist, the culture of health is not only the mechanical connection of the two concepts—the concept of ″culture″ and the concept of ″health″. This is their synthesis, which forms a new quality, a new content. Skumin examines the culture of health as the specific science, that develops the theoretical and practical tasks of harmonious development of the spiritual, mental, and physical human force, forming of optimum environment, which provides a higher level of creativity of life. Thus, Skumin argues that the culture of health is a separate science, that creates new content. The main challenge of culture of health is the development of spiritual, mental and physical capabilities of man.

The Culture of Health means recognizing health's central importance in the lives. Expounding the philosophical aspects of his Doctrine of Culture of Health, Skumin referred to the works of Helena Blavatsky, Helena and Nicholas Roerich, Konstantin Tsiolkovsky, and Alexander Chizhevsky. In some of his publications, he argues that the Culture of Health will play an important role in the creation of a human spiritual society into the Solar System.

He elaborated on the theosophical conceptions of spiritual evolution and proposed (1990) a classification of Homo spiritalis (Latin: spiritual man), the sixth root race, consisting of eight subraces: HS0 Anabiosis spiritalis, HS1 Scientella spiritalis, HS2 Aurora spiritalis, HS3 Ascensus spiritalis, HS4 Vocatus spiritalis, HS5 Illuminatio spiritalis, НS6 Creatio spiritalis, and HS7 Servitus spiritalis. According to Skumin:

- Anabiosis spiritalis is spirituality in the potential of unmanifest accumulations of personality, the charge of the fires of spiritual creation;
- Scientella spiritalis is the cordial presentiment of the presence and demands of the spirit, spiritualization of the fire of centers, glimpses of self-consciousness of a spiritual person;
- Aurora spiritalis is the imperative of the spirit, the action of the spiritual fire of the centers in the heart, the kindling of the fire of the spirit, the formation of the orientation of the personality to the spiritual improvement of life;
- Ascensus spiritalis is the dawn of spiritual aspirations, the action of the fire of the spirit in the heart, searching spiritual work, aspiration of self-consciousness to merge with the One Spirit;
- Vocatus spiritalis is the maturation of spiritual accumulations, the purposeful spiritual creation, self-awareness and realization of a person as a warrior of the spirit;
- IIluminatio spiritalis is the beginning of the fiery transmutation, the lighting of the achievement fire; revealing the identity of man - the earthly carrier of the Thoughts of the One Spirit;
- Creatio Spiritalis is the beginning of fiery creation, the action of the fire of achievement in the heart, the revealing self-consciousness of man as the earthly carrier of the Light of the One Spirit;
- Servitus Spiritalis is the carrying a consciously accepted duty-commission, the synthesis of spirituality in the clarity of knowledge of a fiery man.

So, the culture of health is an integral sphere of knowledge that develops and solves theoretical and practical tasks of harmonious development of people's spiritual, mental, and physical strength, health improvement of biosocial environment that provides a higher life creative level on this basis (by Skumin and Bobina, 1994).

== Literary and publishing activities ==
Skumin wrote several books of fiction, and also essays. He is the author of music and lyrics of several songs. Among them anthem "To Health via Culture". This anthem consists of four stanzas. The capital letters each of the four stanzas form the word Agni.

In 1995, Skumin became the first editor-in-chief (EIC) of "The Journal To Health Via Culture". This journal of the World Organisation of Culture of Health (″World Health Culture Organization″) received an International Standard Serial Number (ISSN) 0204–3440. The main topics of the magazine are the dissemination of ideas of Culture of Health, holistic medicine, and Roerichism. The Organization also has its own publishing house ("To Health via Culture").

Skumin wrote many books and articles on a variety medical and spiritual topics advocating a holistic approach to health. He is the author or co-author of a series illustrated books on the Culture of Health, Agni Yoga, and Roerichism.

Selected bibliography
- — (1980). Психотерапия и психопрофилактика в системе реабилитации больных с протезами клапанов сердца: Автореферат диссертации на соискание учёной степени кандидата медицинских наук [Psychotherapy and psychoprophylaxis in the rehabilitation of the patients with prosthetic heart valves: The dissertation on competition of a scientific degree of the candidate of medical sciences] (in Russian). Kharkov: Ministry of Health of the USSR. Archived from the original on 21 September 2021.
- — (1980). Психотерапия и психопрофилактика в системе реабилитации больных с протезами клапанов сердца: Методические рекомендации [Psychotherapy and psychoprophylaxis in the rehabilitation of the patients with prosthetic heart valves: Methodical recommendations] (in Russian). Kiev: Ministry of Healthcare of Ukrainian SSR. Archived from the original on 5 September 2021.
- — with Filatov, A. T.; Kobzar, A. D.; Tchernenko, O. V. (1983). Гипносуггестивная психотерапия: Mетодические рекомендации [Hypno-suggestive psychotherapy: Methodical recommendations] (in Russian). Kharkov: The Ukrainian Republican Council of trade unions resorts. Archived from the original on 27 June 2021.
- — with Filatov, A. T.; Martynenko, A. A. (1984). Система психотерапии в комплексе санаторно-курортного лечения больных, перенесших инфаркт миокарда: Mетодические рекомендации [System of psychotherapy in the complex of sanatorium-and-spa treatment of patients after myocardial infarction: Methodical recommendations] (in Russian). Kharkov: The Ukrainian Republican Council of trade unions resorts. Archived from the original on 21 September 2021.
- — with Filatov, A. T. (1985). Психопрофилактика и психотерапия в кардиохирургии [Psychoprophylaxis and psychotherapy in cardiac surgery] (in Russian). Kiev: Zdorovja: Medical Practitioners Library. Archived from the original on 12 May 2021.
- — (1985). Психологические методы исследования в педиатрической практике: Методические рекомендации [Psychological research methods in pediatric practice: Methodical recommendations.] (in Russian). Kharkov: The Ukrainian Republican Council of trade unions resorts. Archived from the original on 6 July 2021.
- — (1985). Медицинская психология и психотерапия в системе реабилитации детей и подростков с хронической патологией органов пищеварения: Методические рекомендации [Medical psychology and psychotherapy in the rehabilitation of children and adolescents with chronic diseases of digestive organs: Methodical recommendations] (in Russian). Kharkov: The Ukrainian Republican Council of trade unions resorts. Archived from the original on 12 May 2021.
- — with Serduk, A. I.; Fastovetz, A. M. (1985). Психотерапия, психогигиена, психропрофилактика в учреждениях семейного отдыха: Mетодические рекомендации [Psychotherapy, mental hygiene, and psychoprophylaxis in a sanatoriums for family vacation: Methodical recommendations] (in Russian). Kharkov: The Ukrainian Republican Council of trade unions resorts. Archived from the original on 21 September 2021.
- — with Aparnev, S. V. (1985). Психофизическая лечебно-профилактическая гимнастика [Psychophysical therapeutic and preventive exercises] (in Russian). Gelendzhik: Lector. Archived from the original on 21 September 2021.
- — with Lukyanova, E. M. [in Ukrainian]; Belousov, Yu. V.; Filatov, A. T. (1986). Использование психотерапии в комплексном лечении хронических заболеваний пищеварительной системы у детей: Mетодические рекомендации [The use of psychotherapy in the treatment of chronic diseases of the digestive system in children: Methodical recommendations] (in Russian). Kiev: Ministry of Healthcare of Ukrainian SSR. Archived from the original on 17 September 2021.
- — with Belousov, Yu. V. (1987). Психотерапия в детской гастроэнтерологии: Учебное пособие [Psychotherapy in Pediatric Gastroenterology: Tutorial] (in Russian). Moscow: Ministry of Health of the USSR. Archived from the original on 14 June 2021.
- — (1987). Психотерапия детей и подростков: Методические рекомендации [Psychotherapy of children and adolescents: Methodical recommendations] (in Russian). Kharkov: The Ukrainian Republican Council of trade unions resorts. Archived from the original on 6 July 2021.
- — (1988). Пограничные психические расстройства у детей и подростков с хроническими болезнями пищеварительной системы (клиника, систематика, лечение, психопрофилактика). Автореферат диссертации на соискание учёной степени доктора медицинских наук [Border mental disorders in children and adolescents with chronic diseases of the digestive system (clinic, systematics, treatment, psychoprophylaxis). The dissertation on competition of a scientific degree of the doctor of medical sciences] (in Russian). Moscow: Ministry of Health of the USSR. Archived from the original on 12 May 2021.
- — Gavrilenko, A. F.; Kaduk, G. I. (1988). Диагностика и лечение пограничных психических нарушений у детей с хроническими болезнями желудочно-кишечного тракта: Mетодические рекомендации [Diagnosis and treatment of borderline mental disorders in children with chronic diseases of the gastrointestinal tract: Methodical recommendations] (in Russian). Kharkov: The Ukrainian Republican Council of trade unions resorts. Archived from the original on 12 May 2021.
- — (1988). Немедикаментозные методы терапии в детской гастроэнтерологии: Mетодические рекомендации [Nonpharmacologic treatments for children with gastrointestinal diseases: Guidelines] (in Russian). Kharkov: The Ukrainian Republican Council of trade unions resorts. Archived from the original on 21 September 2021.
- — with Ivanova, M. V.; Baklanov, V. A. (1988). Лечение детей на курортах Украины [Treatment of children in the resorts of Ukraine] (in Russian). Kiev: Zdorovja. Archived from the original on 21 September 2021.
- — (1989). Boundary psychic disfunctions in infants and teenagers suffering from chronic disorders in digestive system (clinical picture, systematism, treatment, psychic prophylaxis). Moscow: Open Gray. Archived from the original on 1 June 2021.
- — with Aparnev, S. V. (1990). Как стать здоровым [How to become healthy] (in Russian). Krasnodar: Lector. Archived from the original on 11 July 2021.
- — with Kaduk, G. I. (1990). Исследование психического статуса больных на психотерапевтическом приёме: Mетодические рекомендации [Study on the mental status of the patients on a psychotherapeutic session: Methodical recommendations] (in Russian). Kharkov: The Ukrainian Republican Council of trade unions resorts. Archived from the original on 11 July 2021.
- — with Kaduk, G. I.; Bobina, L. A. (1990). Психологические и психотерапевтические аспекты работы в учреждениях семейного отдыха: Mетодические рекомендации [Psychological and psychotherapeutic aspects of treatment in the sanatoriums for family vacation: Methodical recommendations] (in Russian). Kharkov: The Ukrainian Republican Council of trade unions resorts. Archived from the original on 6 July 2021.
- — (1991). Основы Йоги [Basics of Yoga] (in Russian). Kharkov. Archived from the original on 3 June 2021.
- — (1992). Йога — путь самопознания [Yoga: the path of self-discovery] (in Russian). Cheboksary: Crystal. Archived from the original on 4 June 2021.
- — (1992). Йога: к Здоровью через Культуру [Yoga: to Health via Culture] (in Russian). Cheboksary: Intellect. Archived from the original on 3 June 2021.
- — (1993). Искусство психотренинга и здоровье [The art of mind control for healthy lifestyle] (in Russian). Kharkov: To Health via Culture. ISBN 978-5-86389-002-9. Archived from the original on 13 May 2021.
- — (1994). Йога: путь самосовершенствования [Yoga: the path of self-improvement] (in Russian). Novocheboksarsk: TEROS. ISBN 978-5-88167-001-6. Archived from the original on 23 June 2021.
- — with Bobina, L. A. (1994). Пропедевтика Культуры Здоровья: Учебное пособие [Propedeutics of Culture of Health: Tutorial] (in Russian). Novocheboksarsk: TEROS. ISBN 978-5-88167-002-3. Archived from the original on 5 July 2021.
- — (1995). Афоризмы Агни Йоги [Sutras of Agni Yoga.] (in Russian). Novocheboksarsk: TEROS. ISBN 978-5-88167-007-8. Archived from the original on 14 June 2021.
- — (1995). Легенды, притчи, сказания Агни Йоги [Legends, parables, and stories of Agni Yoga.] (in Russian). Novocheboksarsk: TEROS. ISBN 978-5-88167-008-5. Archived from the original on 27 June 2021.
- — (1995). Культура здоровья — фундаментальная наука о человеке [A Culture of Health as a fundamental human science] (in Russian). Novocheboksarsk: TEROS. ISBN 978-5-88167-003-0. Archived from the original on 23 June 2021.
- — with Aunovsky, O. K. (1995). Светоносцы (о семье Рерихов) [The Bringers of the Light (The story of the Roerich family)] (in Russian). Novocheboksarsk: TEROS. ISBN 978-5-88167-004-7. Archived from the original on 13 May 2021.
- — (1996). Духовное Знание: ноология и культура духовного здоровья [Spiritual knowledge: noology and the culture of spiritual health] (in Russian). Novocheboksarsk: TEROS. ISBN 978-5-88167-011-5. Archived from the original on 3 June 2021.
- — (1996). И воздвигнем духа сияющий храм: духовность — лейтмотив Культуры Здоровья [Let us build a shining Temple of the Spirit: Spirituality is the leitmotif of Cultural of Health] (in Russian). Novocheboksarsk: TEROS. ISBN 978-5-88167-010-8. Archived from the original on 3 June 2021.
- — (1996). Ступени и тернии духовного роста: Учение Культуры Здоровья об основах ноодиагностики [Stage and the thorns of spiritual growth: Culture of Health's approach to spiritual diagnostic] (in Russian). Novocheboksarsk: TEROS. ISBN 978-5-88167-013-9. Archived from the original on 3 June 2021.
- — (1996). Человек духовный: роль культуры духовного здоровья в утверждении новой человеческой расы на планете [Spiritual Man: The role of the Culture of spiritual health for approval of the new human race on the planet] (in Russian). Novocheboksarsk: TEROS. ISBN 978-5-88167-012-2. Archived from the original on 9 March 2021.
- — (1997). О былом и грядущем: медитационные притчи [About the past and the future: Parables for meditation] (in Russian). Novocheboksarsk: TEROS. ISBN 978-5-88167-017-7. Archived from the original on 19 May 2021.
- — (1997). Праздники Духа: важнейшие Памятные Дни для адептов Культуры Здоровья. [Holidays of Spirit: the most important commemorative days for followers of culture of health] (in Russian). Novocheboksarsk: TEROS. ISBN 978-5-88167-015-3. Archived from the original on 3 June 2021.
- — (1997). Развитие духовности: ведущие средства Культуры Здоровья для выявления духовного потенциала индивидуальности [How to develop the spirituality: the main methods of Culture of Health for development of spiritual potential of the personality] (in Russian). Novocheboksarsk: Teros. ISBN 978-5-88167-014-6. Archived from the original on 3 June 2021.
- — (1997). Свет Мудрости: о Духовном Университете Миссия Агни Йоги — ДУМАЙ [The Light of Wisdom: About Spiritual University "Mission of Agni Yoga"] (in Russian). Novocheboksarsk: TEROS. ISBN 978-5-88167-016-0. Archived from the original on 3 June 2021.
- — (1997). Учение Жизни: Хрестоматия Т.1 [The Teaching of Life: Reader] (in Russian). Vol. 1. Novocheboksarsk: TEROS. ISBN 978-5-88167-009-2. Archived from the original on 19 May 2021.
- — (1998). Учение Жизни: Хрестоматия Т.2 [The Teaching of Life: Reader] (in Russian). Vol. 2. Novocheboksarsk: TEROS. ISBN 978-5-88167-019-1. Archived from the original on 19 May 2021.
- — (2002). Культура Здоровья: избранные лекции [Culture of Health: The Selected Lectures] (in Russian). Cheboksary: To Health via Culture. ISBN 978-5-88167-019-1. Archived from the original on 29 August 2021.
- — (2002). Молитвы, гимны, притчи Культуры Здоровья [Culture of Health: prayers, hymns, parables] (in Russian). Cheboksary: To Health via Culture. ISBN 978-5-88167-018-4. Archived from the original on 24 May 2021.
- — with Belousov, Yu. V.; Akhmedov, T. I. (2003). Немедикаментозные методы реабилитации при заболеваниях желудочно-кишечного тракта у детей и подростков: Учебное пособие для врачей [Non-medicamental rehabilitation methods for diseases of the gastrointestinal tract in children and adolescents: Study guide for physicians] (in Russian). Kharkov: Consum. ISBN 978-966-7920-39-5. Archived from the original on 24 May 2021.
- — (2007). Гимны Культуры Здоровья [Gimns of Culture of Health] (in Russian). Cheboksary: To Health via Culture. ISBN 978-5-88167-030-6. Archived from the original on 24 May 2021.
- — with Bobina, L. A. (2012). Культура и здоровье — определение и синтез понятий: Учебное пособие [The culture and the health – identification and synthesis of the concepts: Tutorial] (in Russian). Cheboksary: To Health via Culture. ISBN 978-5-88167-036-8. Archived from the original on 5 June 2021.
- — with Bobina, L. A. (2012). Концепция учения о культуре здоровья: Учебное пособие [The concept of Doctrine of Culture of Health: Tutorial] (in Russian). Cheboksary: To Health via Culture. ISBN 978-5-88167-037-5. Archived from the original on 5 June 2021.
- — with Bobina, L. A. (2012). Духовная основа учения о культуре здоровья: Учебное пособие [The spiritual basis of Doctrine of Culture of Health: Tutorial] (in Russian). Cheboksary: To Health via Culture. ISBN 978-5-88167-038-2. Archived from the original on 5 June 2021.
- — with Bobina, L. A. (2012). Действенная основа учения о культуре здоровья: Учебное пособие [The practical basis of Doctrine of Culture of Health: Tutorial] (in Russian). Cheboksary: To Health via Culture. ISBN 978-5-88167-039-9. Archived from the original on 5 June 2021.
- — with Bobina, L. A. (2012). Научная основа учения о культуре здоровья: Учебное пособие [The scientific basis of Doctrine of Culture of Health: Tutorial] (in Russian). Cheboksary: To Health via Culture. ISBN 978-5-88167-040-5. Archived from the original on 5 June 2021.
- — with Bobina, L. A. (2013). Гимны Культуры Здоровья: Учебное пособие [Gimns of Culture of Health: Tutorial] (in Russian). Cheboksary: To Health via Culture. ISBN 978-5-88167-041-2. Archived from the original on 21 June 2021.
- — with Bobina, L. A. (2013). Праздники Культуры Здоровья: Учебное пособие [The holidays Culture of Health: Tutorial] (in Russian). Cheboksary: To Health via Culture. ISBN 978-5-88167-042-9. Archived from the original on 5 June 2021.
- Skumin, Victor (2019). Agni Yoga. Sunny Path. ISBN 978-5-88167-046-7.

== Trivia ==
- According to a study conducted in 2015, Skumin was included in "Russia team on medicine". This list includes fifty-three famous Russian medical scientists from the Russian Federation, the Soviet Union, and the Russian Empire who were born in 1757–1950. Physicians of all specialities listed here. Among them Vladimir Bekhterev, Vladimir Demikhov, Sergei Korsakoff, Ivan Pavlov, Nikolay Pirogov, Ivan Sechenov.
- In the online poll "The Name of Russia", completed in 2017, Skumin by a wide margin is on first position in the section "The Glory of Russia". Also in the top 10 leaders in "The Glory of Russia" are Fyodor Dostoyevsky, Alexander Pushkin, Seraphim of Sarov, Joseph Stalin (Jughashvili). At the same time Skumin is on fifteenth position in the section "The Shame of Russia". Mikhail Gorbachev and Boris Berezovsky are in fourteenth and sixteenth positions in this list, and on the top of the rating "The Shame of Russia" are Alexander Lukashenko and Vladimir Putin.
- The Epoch Times in 2022 reported the participation of Viсtor Skumin in psychological experiments with plants.

== See also ==
- Agni Yoga
- Neo-Theosophy
- Open heart surgery
- Penza Oblast
- Roerichism
- Russian Cosmism
- Skumin
- Yoga in Russia
