= Aleksander Ludwik Radziwiłł =

Polish–Lithuanian nobleman (1594–1654)

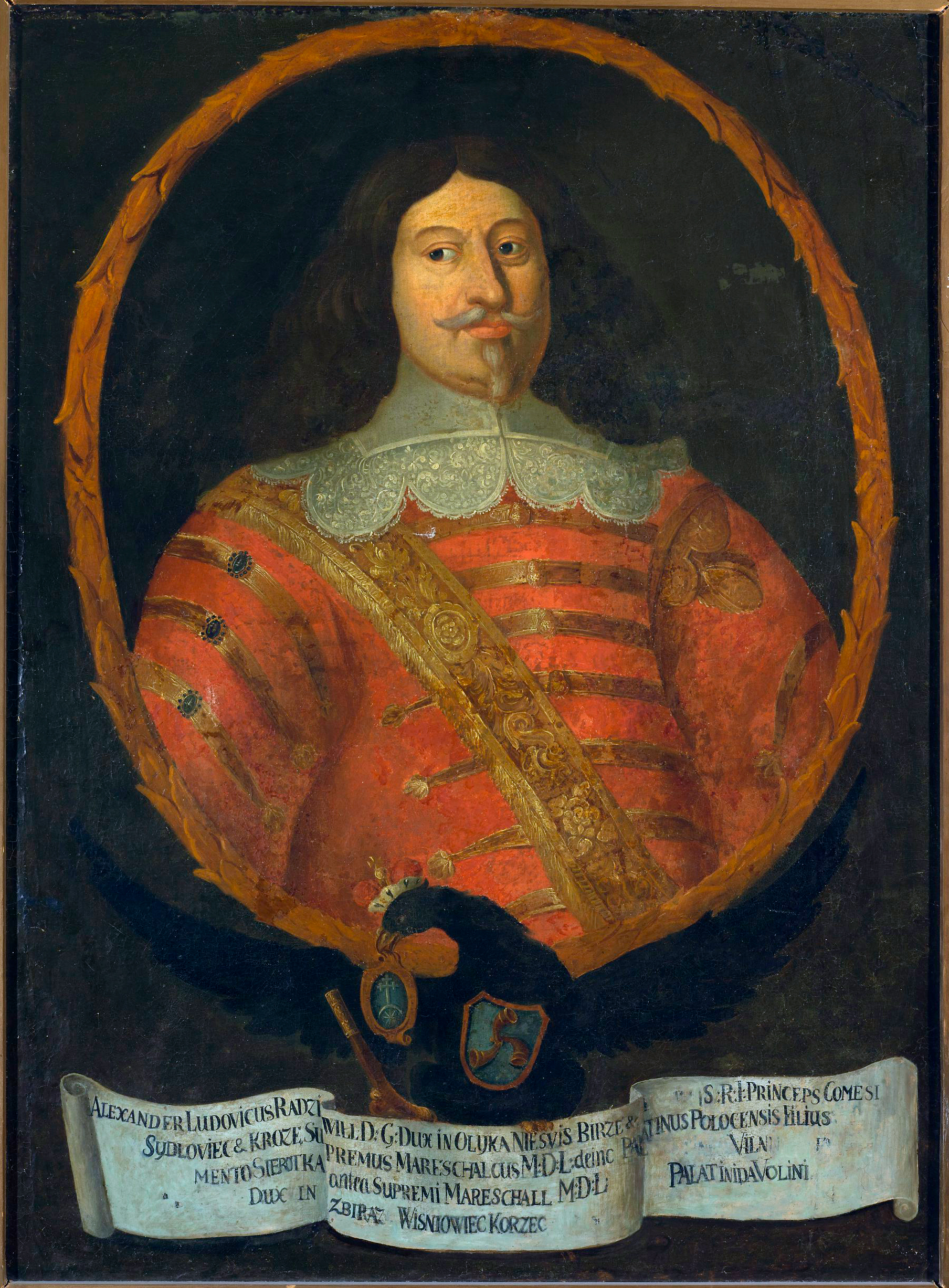
- Born: 4 August 1594; Nieśwież
- Died: 30 March 1654 (aged 59); Bologna
- Spouses: Tekla Anna Wołłowicz; Katarzyna Eugenia Tyszkiewicz; Lucrezia Maria Strozzi
- Children: with Tekla Anna Wołłowicz: Mikolaj Krzysztof Radziwiłł; Anna Eufemia Radziwiłł; Albrecht Radziwiłł; Jerzy Radziwiłł; Michał Kazimierz Radziwiłł; Joanna Katarzyna Radziwiłł; Jan Radziwiłł; Prancska Radziwiłł with Katarzyna Eugenia Tyszkiewicz: Ludwik Radziwiłł; Eleonora Radziwiłł with Lucrezia Maria Strozzi: Dominik Mikołaj Radziwiłł; Cecylia Maria Radziwiłł
- Parent(s): Mikołaj 'Sierotka' Radziwiłł; Elzbieta "Halaszka" Eufemia Wiśniowiecka

Prince Aleksander Ludwik Radziwiłł (Lithuanian: Aleksandras Liudvikas Radvila; 4 August 1594 – 30 March 1654) was a Polish–Lithuanian nobleman.

He was the Ordynat of Nieśwież, Stolnik (Master of the Pantry) of Lithuania since 1626, Krajczy (Carver) of Lithuania since 1630, governor of Brześć Litewski Voivodeship since 1631 to 1635, Court Marshal of Lithuania since 1635, Grand Marshal of Lithuania in 1637-1654 and voivode of Połock Voivodship during 1654. He also held the title Starost.

He married Tekla Anna Wołłowicz in 1626, Katarzyna Eugenia Tyszkiewicz in 1639 and Lucrezia Maria Strozzi in October, 1642 in Warsaw. His marriage to Katarzyna Eugenia Tyszkiewicz, widow of Konstanty Wiśniowiecki's son, led to the conflict between Aleksander Ludwik Radziwłł and Jeremi Wiśniowiecki over the inheritance of Konstanty. Eventually, Katarzyna defected to Jeremi's side and divorced Aleksander, who was forced to give up his claims.

He withdrew from politics during the reign of Sigismund III Vasa but supported his son, Władysław IV Vasa, in the election of 1632. However, towards the end of his life he distanced himself from Władysław, by opposing his plans of war with Ottomans.
