= Samuel Twardowski =

Polish poet (before 1600 – 1661)

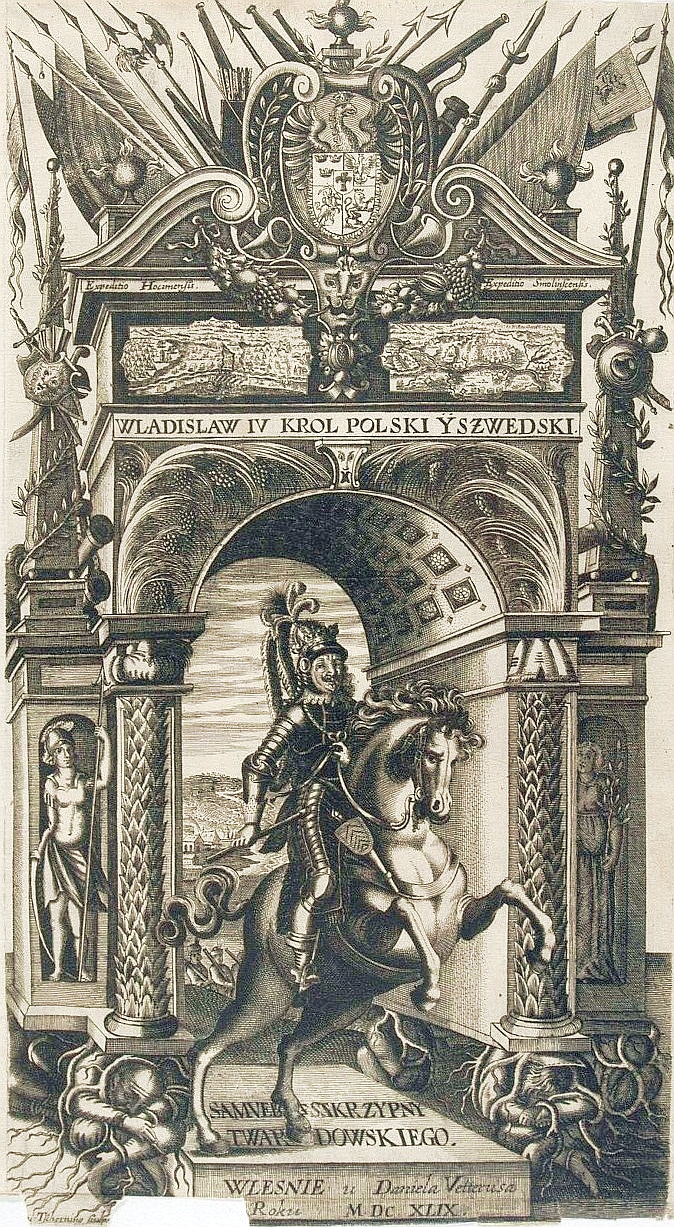
Cover of Twardowski's poem Władysław IV.

Samuel Ludwik Twardowski (before 1600 – 1661) was a Polish poet, diarist, and essayist who gained popularity in the Polish–Lithuanian Commonwealth. He was called by his contemporaries the "Polish Virgil".

== Life and works ==
He was a member of Polish nobility (szlachta), born in Lutynia in Greater Poland region. He was educated in a Jesuit school in Kalisz. Twardowski took part in the 1621 battle of Chocim against the Turks. He was one of the less wealthy nobles and earned his living as a retainer at magnates' courts of various richer families (such as Zbarascy, Wiśniowieccy, Leszczyńscy). During The Deluge, at first he supported the Swedes, but later joined the Polish king John II Casimir.

He served as a secretary of Krzysztof Zbaraski on a diplomatic mission to the Ottoman Empire in 1622–1623. During that time he authored a diary describing the journey in verse: Przewazna legacja J.O. Ksiazecia Krzysztofa Zbaraskiego ("The Important Mission of His Grace Duke Krzysztof Zbaraski", published in 1633).

He also wrote about other historical events, which became a recognizable theme in his works. His most famous and respected work was Wojna domowa z Kozaki i Tatary, Moskwa, potya Szwedami i z-Wegry ("A Civil War with the Cossacks and Tatars, Muscovy, and then with the Swedes and Hungarians", published in 1681 in Kalisz). Wojna domowa is a narrative poem, whose style was inspired by classical and Renaissance authors. It is an account of the Zaporozhian Cossacks' revolt, the Khmelnytsky Uprising against Polish domination and polonisation of Ukraine. That Cossacks, under the leadership of Bohdan Khmelnytsky, also struggled against the Polish-Lithuanian nobility who controlled the regions of modern Ukraine in the mid-17th century. The revolt shook the entire Commonwealth. Twardowski gives first hand accounts of the 1649 siege of Zbaraż and the 1651 battle of Berestechko. His work is considered one of the most authoritative histories of the period.

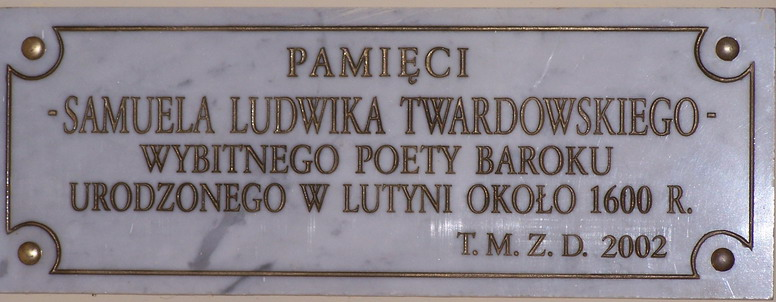
Plaque in Church Assumption of Mary in Lutynia, Poland

His other historical works included the Książę Wiśniowiecki Janusz ("Prince Janusz Wiśniowiecki", published in 1648), poem Satyr na twarz Rzeczypospolitej ("Satire on the face of Rzeczpospolita", 1640), another epic poem Władysław IV ("Władysław IV Vasa", published in 1649) and Wojna domowa ("Civil war").

Twardowski also wrote Baroque pastoral romances, in which he employed the technique of Spanish verse narratives. Those poems include as Nadobna Paskwalina ("Fair Pasqualina", published in 1655) and mythological themes, in Dafnis w drzewo bobkowe przemieniela sie ("Daphne Transformed into a Laurel Tree", published in 1638).

Four of his poems were translated into English by Michael J. Mikoś and issued in Polish Baroque and Enlightenment Literature: An Anthology. Ed. Michael J. Mikoś. Columbus, Ohio/Bloomington, Indiana: Slavica Publishers. 1996.
