= Zbaraski =

Polish princely family

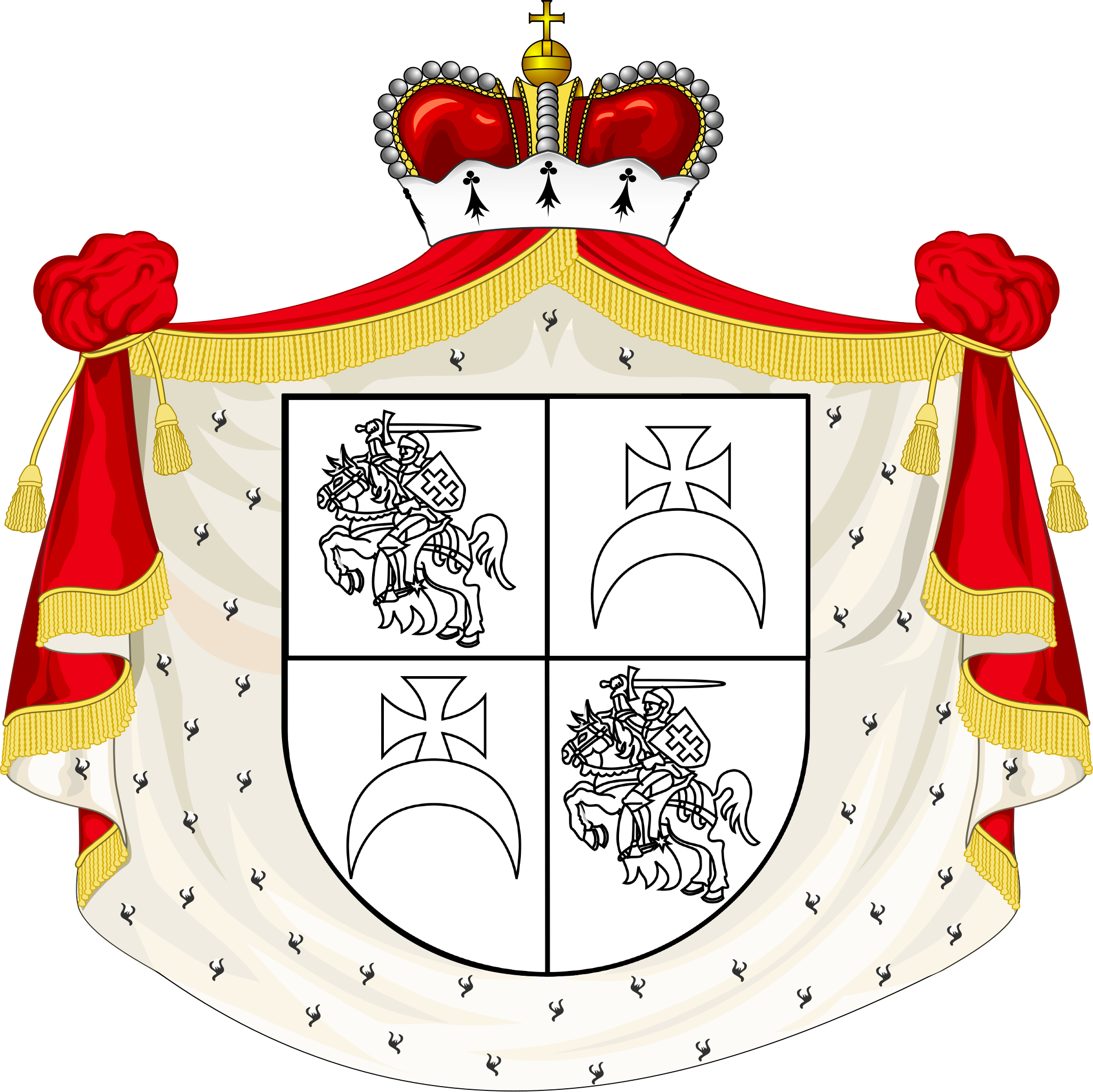
Zbaraski coat of arms

Korybut coat of arms, for comparison

Possessions of Zbarski family in 16th-17th centuries

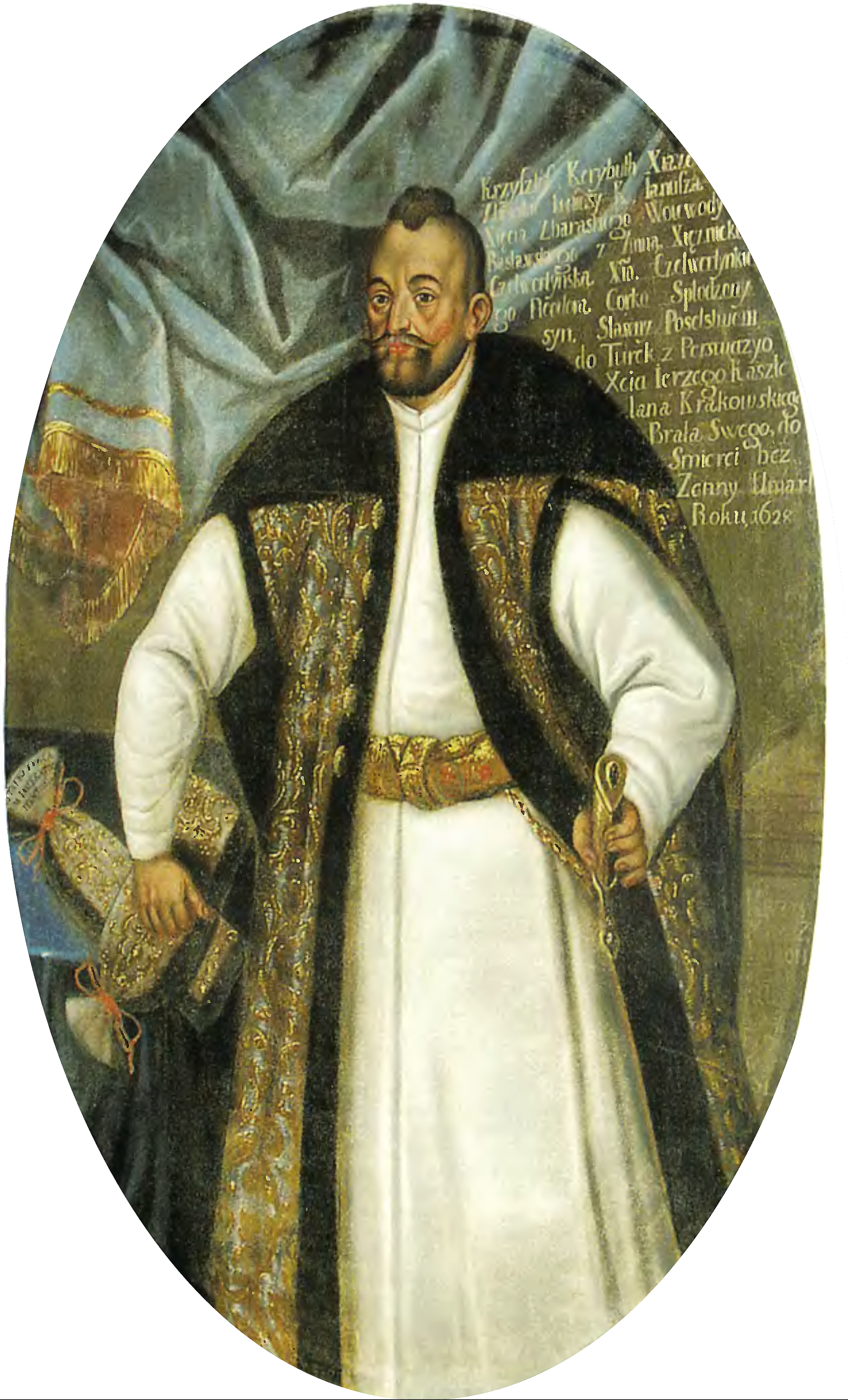
Krzysztof Zbaraski

The House of Zbaraski (Polish: Zbarascy) was a Polish-Lithuanian princely family of Ruthenian origin in the Crown of the Kingdom of Poland domiciled in Volhynia (today Ukraine). The name is derived from the town of Zbarazh, the core of their dominions branched off the princely Nieświcki family. . They claimed to be Gediminids descended from Kaributas and their coat of arms is stamped with the Korybut coat of arms. The line ended in 1631, with their assets overtaken by their cadet branch, the Wiśniowiecki family.

== Notable family members ==
- Siemion "Starszy" Zbaraski (died after 1481), married Katarzyna Cebrowska z Cebra h. Hołobok, the founder of the Princes Zbaraski line
  - Andrzej Zbaraski (1498-1540), married Helena Herburt h. Herburt
    - Mikołaj Zbaraski (c.1540-1574), starost of Krzemieniec, married NN Kozica and Hanna Branković
      - Janusz Zbaraski (c.1553-1608), voivode of Bracław, married Princes Hanna Czetwertyńska h. Pogoń Ruska
        - Jerzy Zbaraski (c. 1573–1631), castelan of Kraków, the last male representative of the Zbaraski family
        - Krzysztof Zbaraski (1580–1627), Great Koniuszy of the Crown
    - Stefan Zbaraski (1540-1585), voivode of Witebsk and Troki, married Hanna Zabrzezińska h. Leliwa, Nastazja Mscisławska h. Pogoń Litewska and Dorota Firlej h. Lewart
      - Piotr Zbaraski (born 1548), married Barbara Jordan h. Trąby
      - Barbara Zbaraska (died 1602), married voivode of Lublin Count Gabriel Tęczyński h. Topór
    - Jerzy Zbaraski (died 1580), married Szczęsna Nasiłkowska h. Półkozic and Barbara Kozińska
    - Władysław Zbaraski (died c. 1581), starost of Botok, married Zofia Przyłuska h. Lubicz
    - Małgorzata Zbaraska (died before 1540), married Stanisław Czermiński z Czermina h. Wieniawa
    - Elżbieta Zbaraska (died before 1540), married Wacław Bawor h. Złota Wolność and Walenty Wkryński h. Grzymała
- Michał Zbaraski Wiśniowiecki (c. 1517), brother of Siemion "Starszy" Zbaraski the founder of the princes Wiśniowiecki line

== Palaces ==
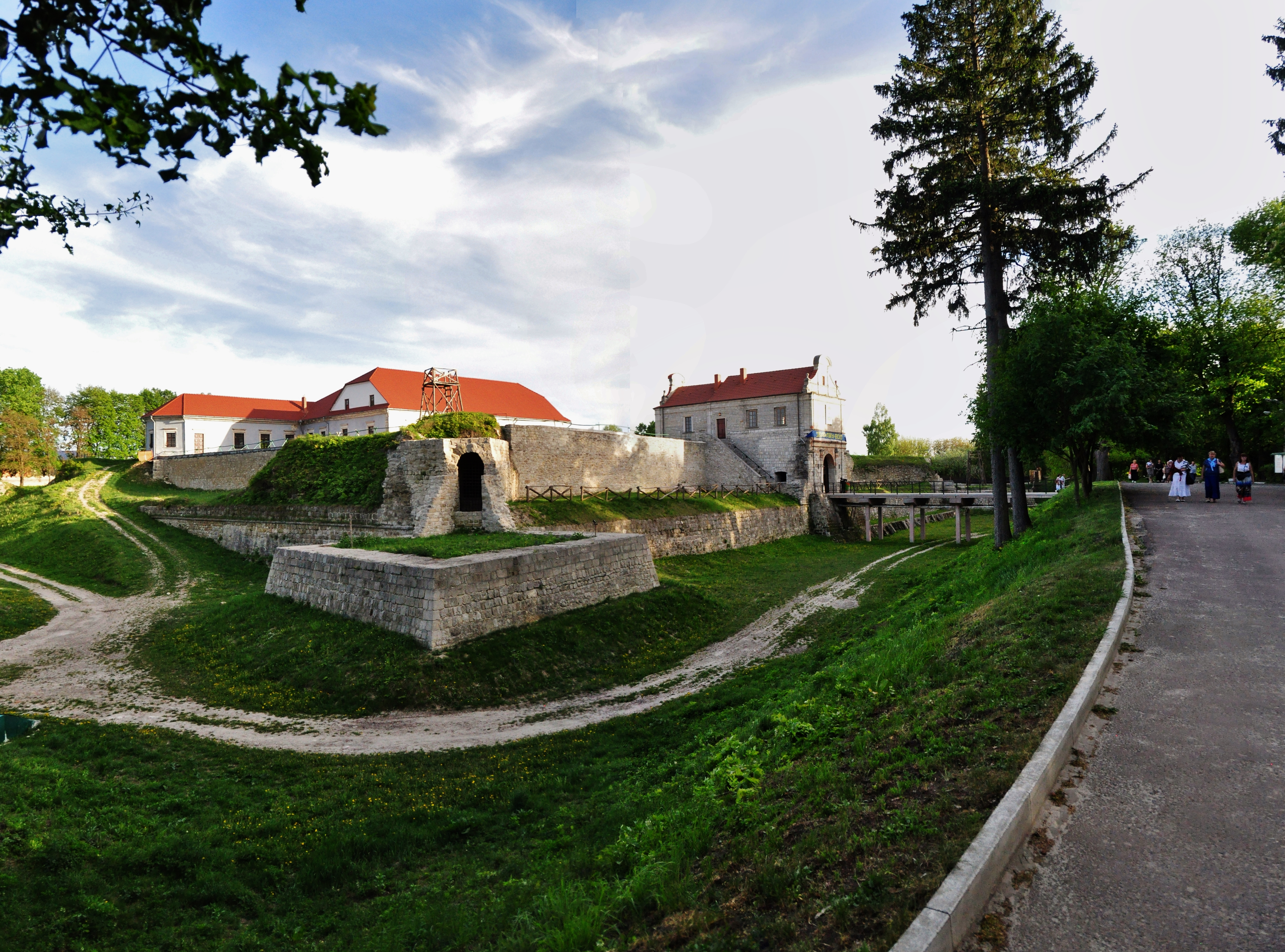
Zbarazh Castle

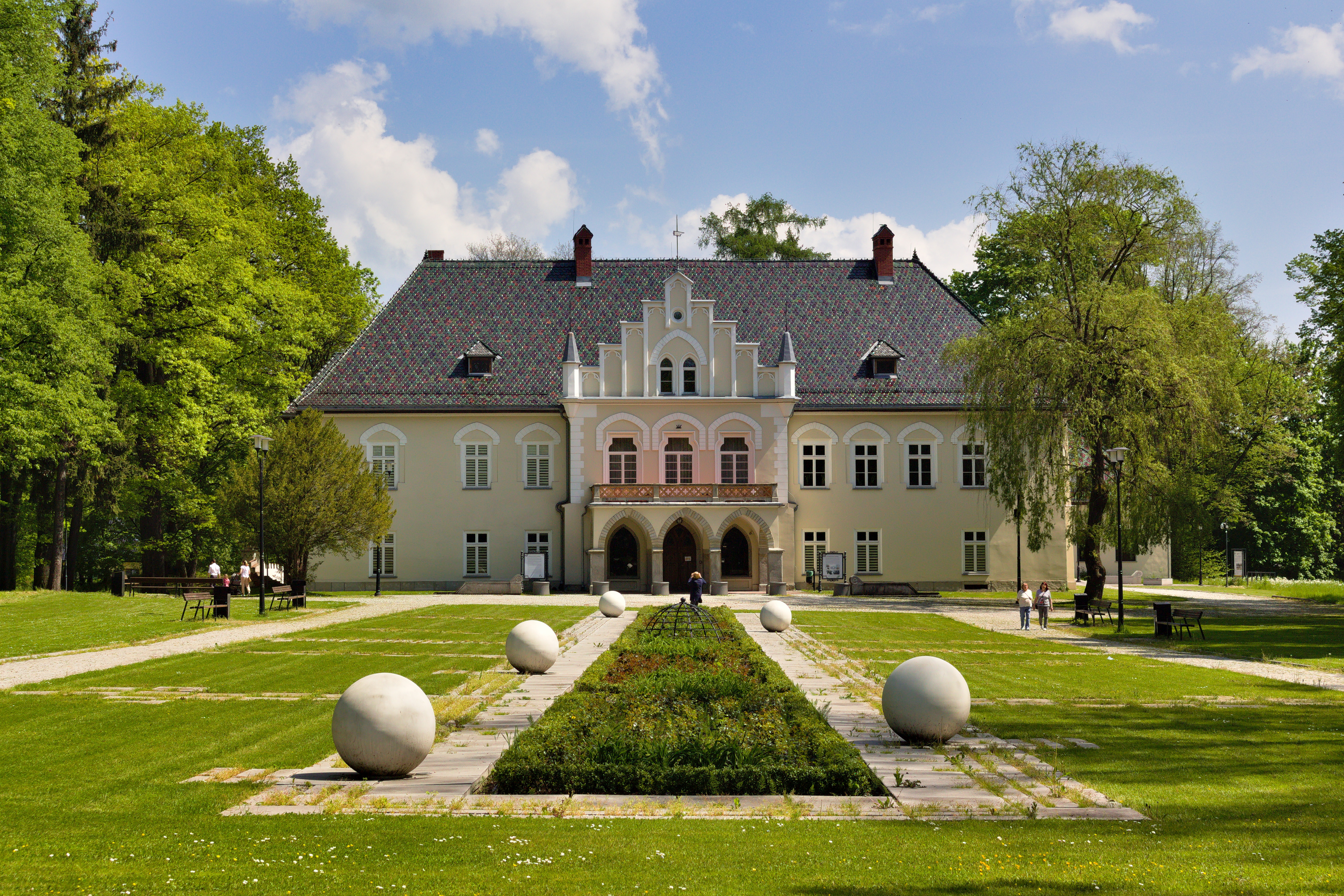
Manor House in w Łodygowice

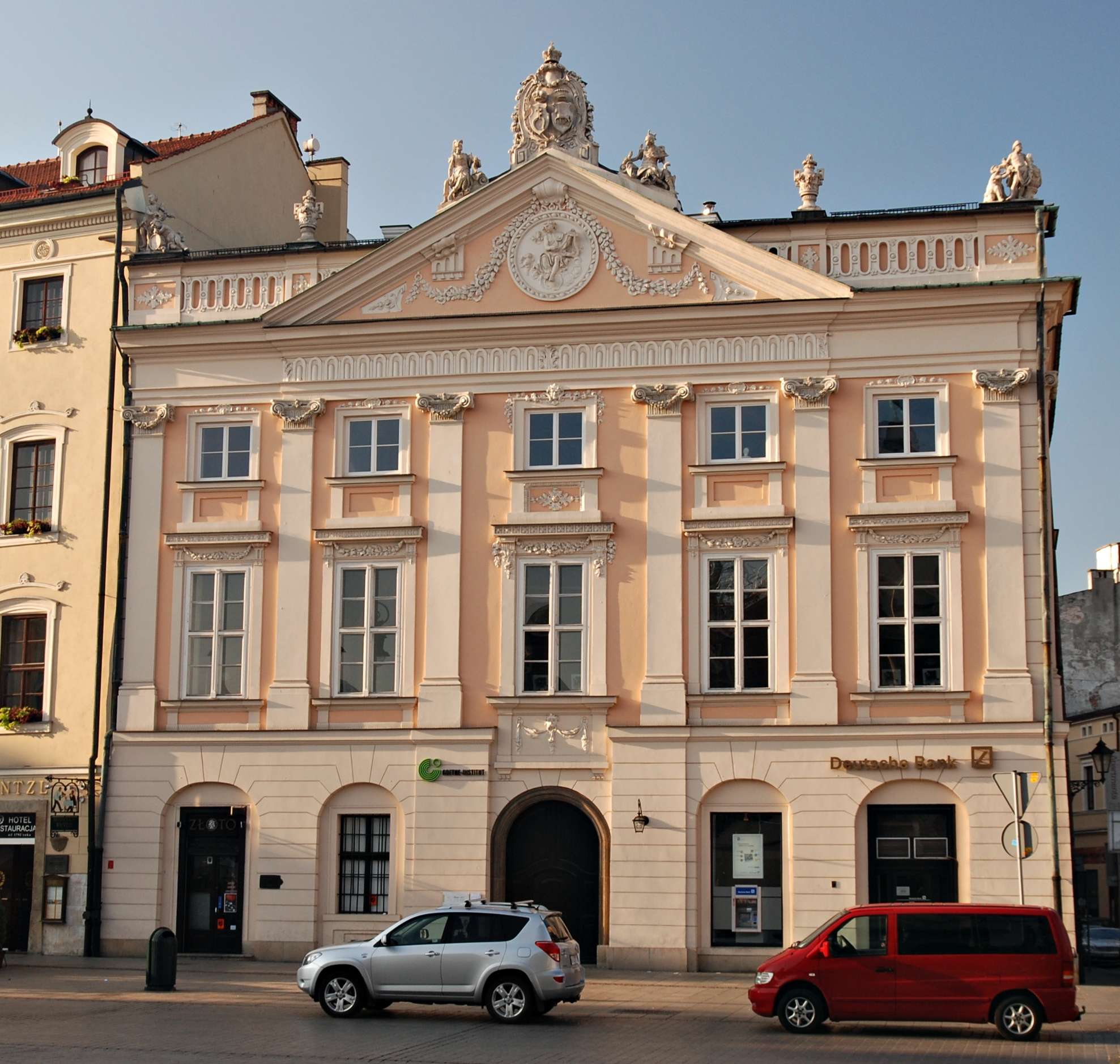
Zbaraski Palace in w Kraków

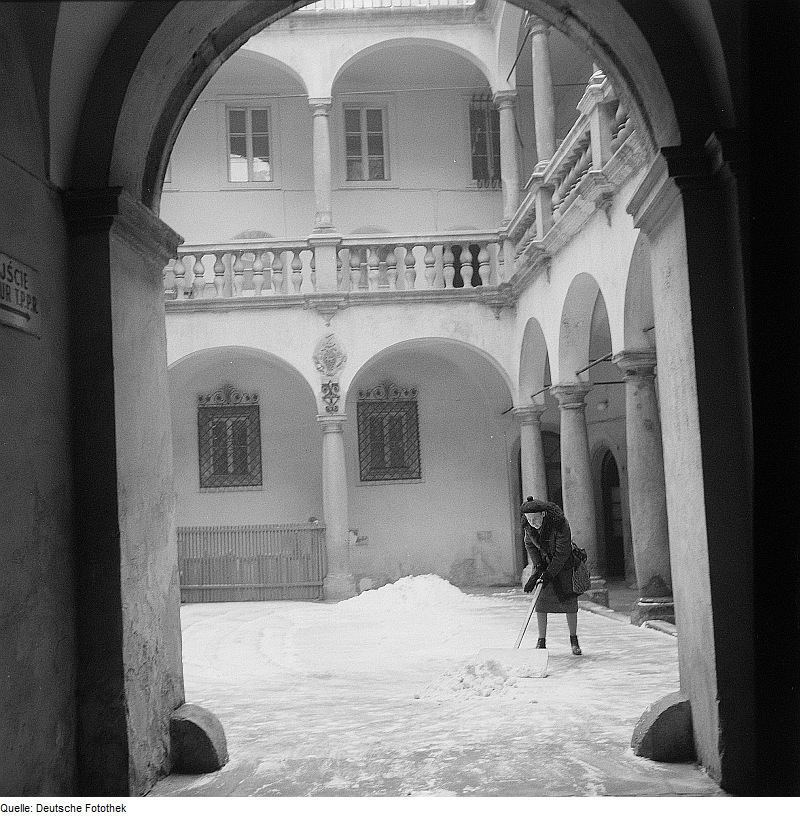
Zbaraski Palace, Kraków, 1960s
