= Katarzyna Eugenia Skumin Tyszkiewicz =

Polish noblewoman (c. 1610 – 1648)

- Coat of arms: Leliwa
- Born: c. 1610
- Died: 1648
- Family: Skumin
- Consort: Jan Rakowski; Janusz Wiśniowiecki; Aleksander Ludwik Radziwiłł
- Issue: with Janusz Wiśniowiecki; Dymitr Jerzy Wiśniowiecki; Konstanty Krzysztof Wiśniowiecki
- Father: Janusz Skumin Tyszkiewicz
- Mother: Barbara Naruszewicz

Katarzyna Eugenia Skumin Tyszkiewicz (c. 1610 – 1648) was a Polish noblewoman.

Katarzyna was the daughter of Janusz Skumin Tyszkiewicz and Barbara Naruszewicz. She was married to Jan Rakowski, Janusz Wiśniowiecki (son of Konstanty Wiśniowiecki) since 1627 and Aleksander Ludwik Radziwiłł since 1639.

Her marriage to Aleksander Ludwik Radziwiłł, led to the conflict between Aleksander Ludwik Radziwłł and Jeremi Wiśniowiecki over the inheritance of Konstanty and Janusz. Eventually, in 1642, Katarzyna defected to Jeremi side and divorced Aleksander, who was forced to give up his claims.

== See also ==
- Skumin
