= Jerzy Zbaraski =

Polish–Lithuanian noble (1574–1631)

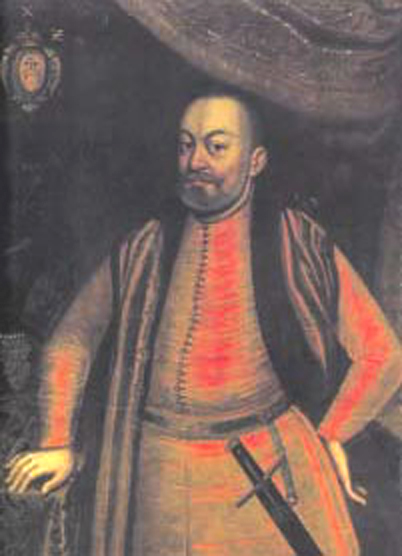
- Coat of arms: Korybut
- Born: 1574; Antonivtsi (now Ukraine)
- Died: 12 July 1631 (aged 56–57); Kraków
- Family: Zbaraski
- Father: prince Janusz Zbaraski
- Mother: Anna Czetwertyńska

Prince Jerzy Zbaraski (Polish: Jerzy Zbaraski; Ukrainian: Юрій Збаразький; 1574 – 12 July 1631 in Kraków) was a Polish–Lithuanian noble (szlachcic). He was the older brother of Krzysztof Zbaraski and the last of the Zbaraski family.

Jerzy was born in 1574. He was the son of Janusz Zbaraski and his wife Anna Czetwertyńska. His younger brother was Krzysztof Zbaraski.

In 1598, he accompanied the court of king Sigismund III Vasa on a visit to Sweden. Zbaraski supported Sigismund III Vasa during the Zebrzydowski Rebellion. He was Krajczy of the Crown since 1612, Podczaszy of the Crown since 1619, Castellan of Kraków since 1620 and Starost of Pinsk, Sokal, Radohoski, Żarnowiec.

He died suddenly on 12 July 1631 in Kraków.

He had no wives nor children. He was the last member of Zbaraski family.
