= Janusz Skumin Tyszkiewicz =

Polish–Lithuanian noble (1570–1642)

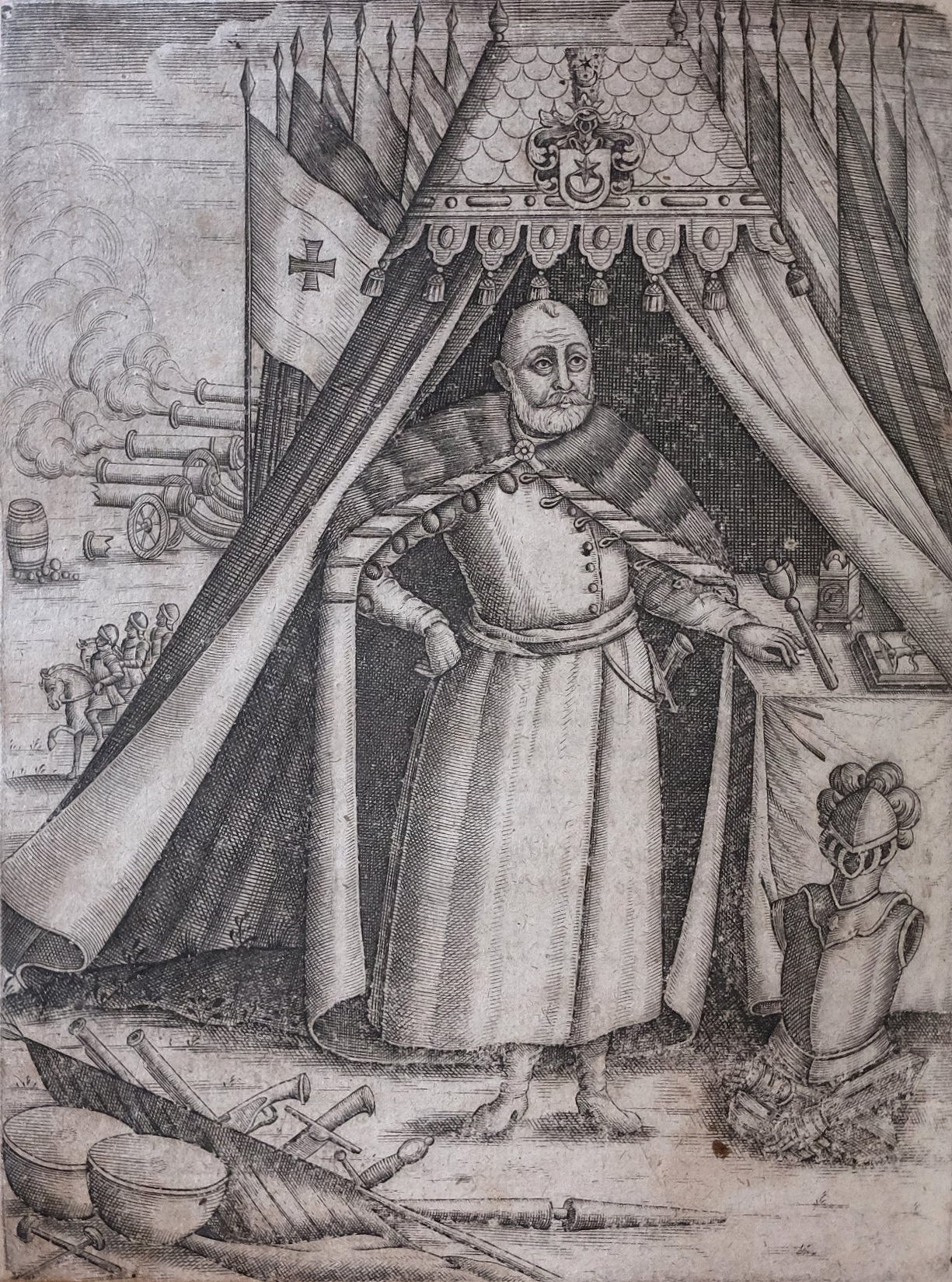
Janusz Skumin

Janusz Skumin Tyszkiewicz (Lithuanian: Jonušas Skuminas Tiškevičius; Belarusian: Януш Скумін Тышкевіч; 1570–1642) was a noble of the Polish–Lithuanian Commonwealth, a politician, a sponsor of Baroque music and a writer (1610+). He held numerous political offices, including voivode of Mścisław (1621–1626), voivode of Trakai (1626–1640) and voivode of Vilnius (1640–1642), as well as starost of Brasławski, Jurbarkas, and Nowy Dwór Gdański in the Polish–Lithuanian Commonwealth.

== Life ==
The son of Teodor Tyszkiewicz and Katarzyna Lacka, he was of the Eastern Catholic faith, and studied abroad at Padua.

Around 1595 he married Barbara Naruszewicz (1580–1627), the daughter of Stanisław Naruszewicz. He had one daughter: Katarzyna Eugenia Tyszkiewicz. After his first wife died, in 1630 he married Zofia Zamiechowska (d. 1635).

In 1619 he donated some of his possessions in Hrodno to the nuns of Order of Saint Benedict.

== See also ==
- Skumin
- Church and monastery of Holy Trinity
