= History of Polish journalism =

History of Polish journalism dates to the 15th century. The first Polish newspaper was Merkuriusz Polski Ordynaryjny, published in 1661.

The Polish language academic journal Yearbook of the History of Polish Press (Rocznik Historii Prasy Polskiej) is dedicated to this topic.

== See also ==
- Mass media in Poland
