= John Sigismund =

John Sigismund may refer to:

- John Sigismund, Elector of Brandenburg (1572–1619)
- John Sigismund Tanner (1705–1775), chief engraver at the Royal Mint of Great Britain
- John Sigismund Vasa (1652), Polish prince who died shortly after birth
- John Sigismund Zápolya (1540–1571), King of Hungary and Prince of Transylvania

Johann Sigismund may refer to:

- Johann Sigismund Elsholtz (1623–1688), German naturalist
- Johann Sigismund Kusser (1660–1727), German-born composer
- Johann Sigismund Riesch (1750–1821), Austrian military officer
- Johann Sigismund Scholze (1705–1750), Silesian music anthologist and poet
