= Marie Louise Gonzaga =

Queen of Poland (1645–1648; 1649–1667)

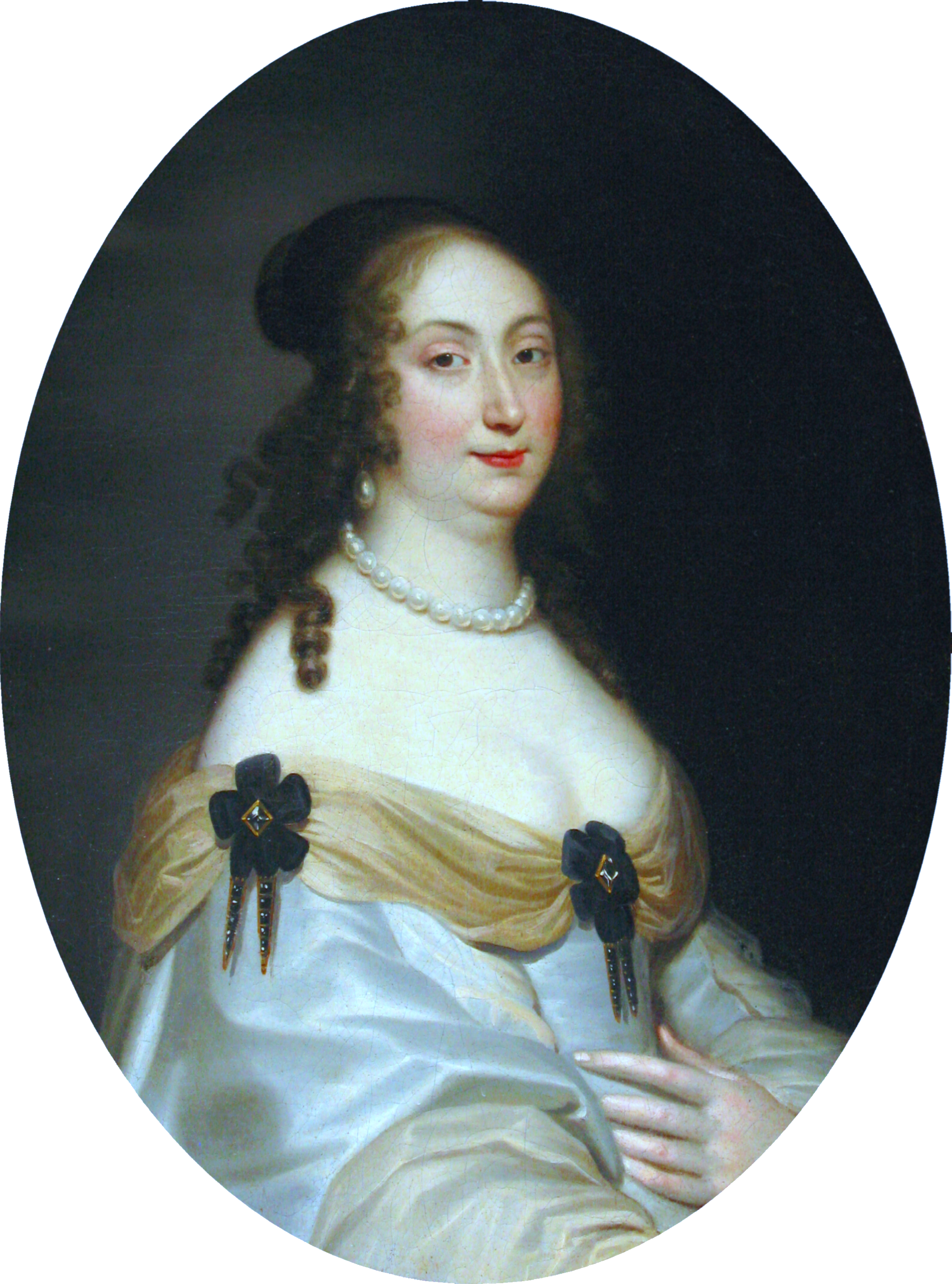
- Portrait by Egmont, 1650

Queen consort of Poland Grand Duchess consort of Lithuania
- Tenure: 5 November 1645 – 20 May 1648; 30 May 1649 – 10 May 1667
- Coronation: 15 July 1646
- Born: 18 August 1611; Nevers, France
- Died: 10 May 1667 (aged 55); Warsaw, Poland
- Burial: Wawel Cathedral, Kraków, Poland
- Spouses: Władysław IV Vasa (m. 1646; died 1648) John II Casimir Vasa (m. 1649)
- Issue: Maria Anna Theresa; John Sigismund
- House: Gonzaga
- Father: Charles I, Duke of Mantua
- Mother: Catherine of Guise

Marie Louise Gonzaga (Italian: Maria Luisa, Polish: Ludwika Maria, Lithuanian: Liudvika Marija; 18 August 1611 – 10 May 1667) was Queen of Poland and Grand Duchess of Lithuania by marriage to two kings of Poland and grand dukes of Lithuania, brothers Władysław IV and John II Casimir. Together with Bona Sforza (1494–1557), she is regarded as one of the most influential and powerful queen consorts of the Kingdom of Poland and the Polish–Lithuanian Commonwealth.

Born in Nevers to Charles I, Duke of Mantua and Catherine of Guise, Marie was brought up at the French court as the future bride of Duke Gaston of Orléans. In 1645, she married Władysław IV of Poland with whom she did not have a harmonious relationship. After his death in 1648, the widowed queen married his half-brother and successor, John II Casimir. Marie Louise exercised considerable influence over her second husband and dictated the political course in the country. An ambitious and energetic woman, she was a strong supporter of an absolute monarchy for which she was reviled by certain spheres of the Polish szlachta and Lithuanian nobility. She, nevertheless, remained active in the Commonwealth's politics and co-sponsored the foundation of the first Polish newspaper, Merkuriusz Polski Ordynaryjny (Polish Mercury Ordinary), in 1661 as well as other public institutions.

While her role is regarded as crucial in repulsing the foreign forces out of Poland-Lithuania during the Swedish Deluge (1655–1660), she became increasingly unpopular for her absolutist policies and her intention of nominating her niece's husband, Henri Jules, the future Prince of Condé, the heir apparent to the Polish-Lithuanian throne. That resulted in a military conflict with the internal opposition, which ended with the defeat of the royal army in 1666, during Lubomirski's rebellion. After Marie Louise's death, John Casimir hesitatingly renounced the crown, and the Commonwealth government officially curtailed the prerogatives of the royal consort.

== Early life and marriage proposal ==
Marie Louise Gonzaga was born on 18 August 1611 in the town of Nevers, France to Charles I, Duke of Mantua, and Catherine de Lorraine-Guise-Mayenne. Marie Louise was supposed to marry Gaston, Duke of Orléans in 1627, but King Louis XIII strongly opposed the marriage and subsequently imprisoned her in the Château de Vincennes and later in a small convent.

The first proposal for her to marry the newly elected King of Poland and Grand Duke of Lithuania, Władysław IV Vasa, was made in 1634, but Władysław eventually married Cecilia Renata of Austria, the daughter of Ferdinand II, Holy Roman Emperor and Maria Anna of Bavaria. This decision was very unfavourable for France and greatly angered Louis XIII because of the newly established alliance between the Austrian Empire and the Polish–Lithuanian Commonwealth.

In 1637, the Abbot of Villeloin, Michel de Marolles, visited Nevers and had the opportunity to play Tarot with the Princess, who had added some innovations to the game. She told Marolles to publish her version which he did. His account is the oldest known set of printed rules of the game of Tarot.

In 1640, Marie Louise met Władysław's brother, John Casimir with whom she had an early affair. She later invited Prince John Casimir to France for her annual literary salon organised in Paris.

== Queen of Poland, Grand Duchess of Lithuania, politics and conflict with nobility ==
Following the death of Cecilia Renata in 1644, Cardinal Jules Mazarin was determined to weaken the alliance between the Polish-Lithuanian Vasa dynasty and the Austrian Habsburg dynasty, the rivals of the French state. Mazarin insisted for Marie Louise to marry the widowed sovereign, making sure that she was the only candidate.

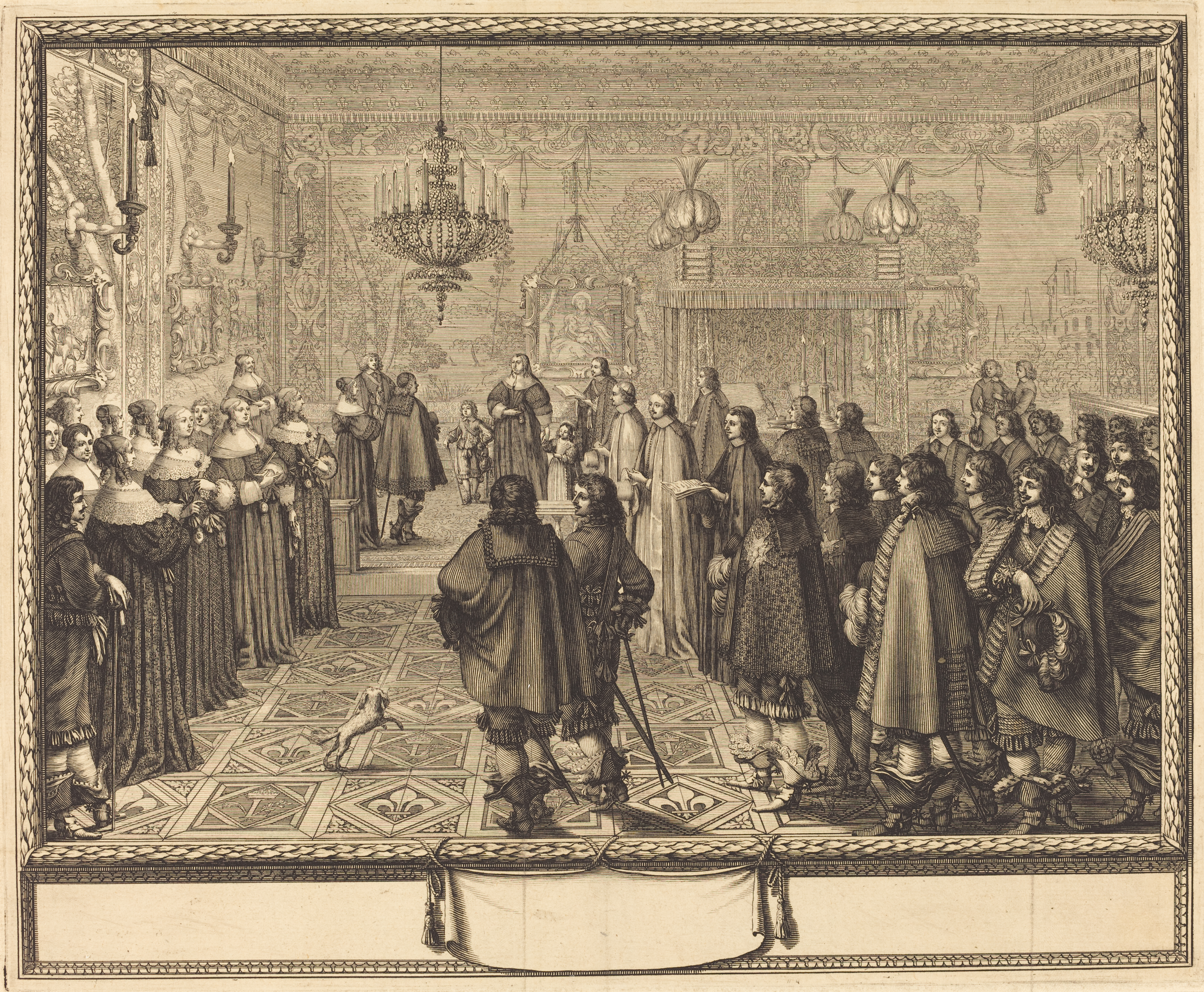
Ceremony of the Contract of Marriage between Vladislas IV, King of Poland and Grand Duke of Lithuania, with Louise Marie of Gonzaga, Princess of Mantua, at Fontainbleau etching by Abraham Bosse from the collection of the National Gallery of Art

Under the pressure of the French government and other Western nations, Marie Louise Gonzaga finally married Władysław by proxy on 5 November 1645. The proper wedding of Marie Louise and Władysław IV took place in Warsaw on 10 March 1646. She was forced by the Commonwealth's parliament (Sejm) and the strongly zealous nobility to change her name from Marie Louise to Ludwika Maria for the marriage to take place, as the given name Maria was then considered in Poland reserved only for Mary, mother of Jesus.

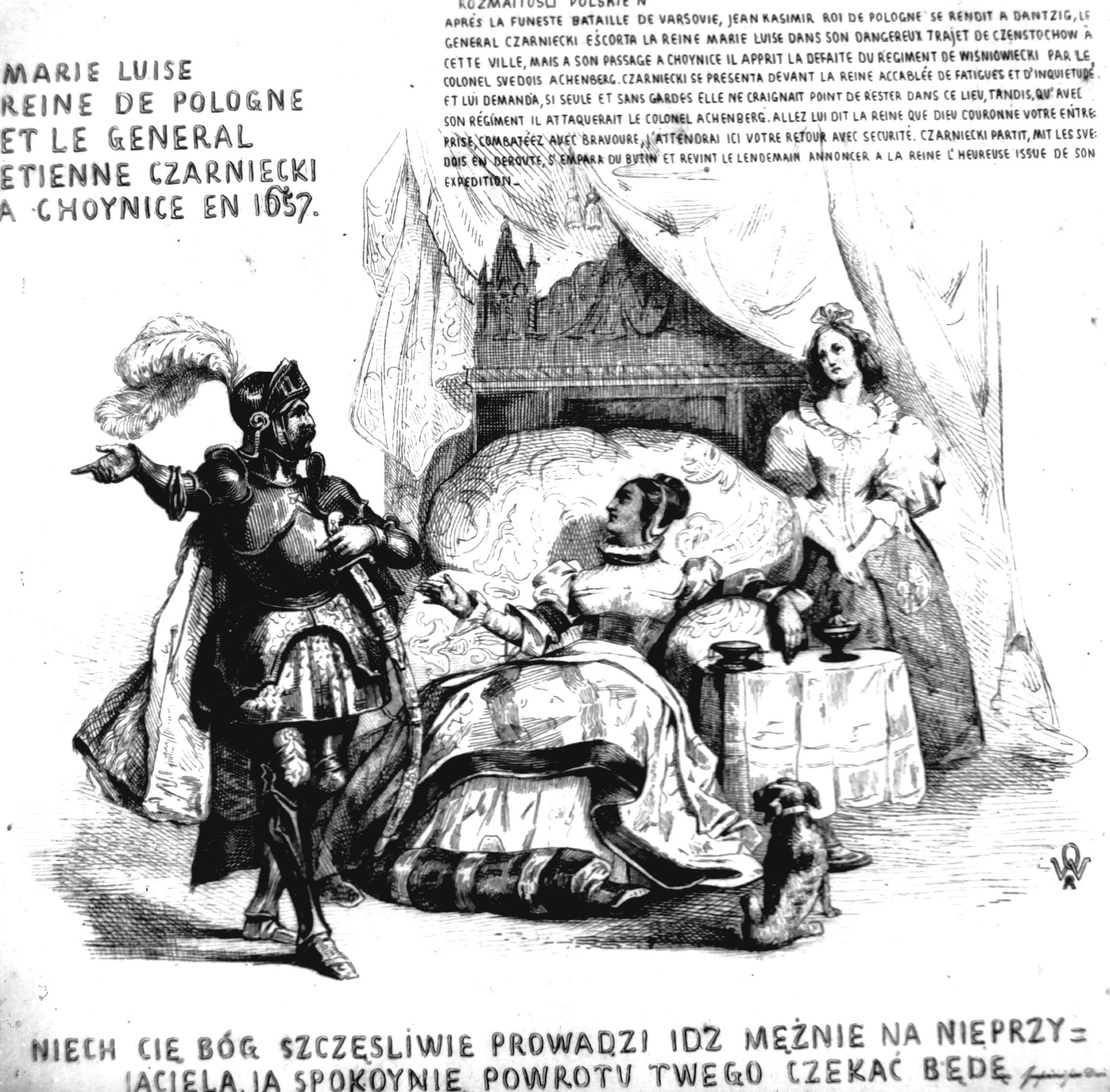
Queen Marie Louise of Poland and Lithuania with Hetman Stefan Czarniecki in Chojnice, 1657

Two years later, on 20 May 1648, Marie Louise was widowed by the sudden death of Władysław IV. John Casimir was eventually elected the next King of Poland and Grand Duke of Lithuania by the parliament, and married her on 30 May 1649. During an 18-year marriage with John Casimir, she gave birth to two children, Maria Anna Teresa and John Sigismund, who died in infancy.

Queen once more, Marie Louise immediately focused on influencing the political views of her new husband. Marie Louise believed that she was more able to control John Casimir rather than his deceased brother Władysław, who was described as extremely stubborn, self-centered and overwhelmingly supporting the nobility. In contrast, Marie Louise opposed the nobility and sought to weaken their power in Parliament. Intelligent, tenacious and with a strong personality, she guided John Casimir throughout his political and military campaigns. This was noticed by a Brandenburgian diplomat, Hoverberk, who stated in his diaries that "by incessant insistence, molestation, complaints and other tricks she controlled the poor king and therefore the entire ill-fated country itself." In contrast to her husband, Marie Louise was reportedly not sympathetic towards the servants, peasants and lower classes but sought to strengthen the Polish-Lithuanian nation in case of war against the powerful and dangerous eastern empires: the Ottoman Empire, the Swedish Empire and the Russian Empire.

Marie Louise was an active and energetic woman, with ambitious economic and political plans for the Polish–Lithuanian Commonwealth. The Polish-Lithuanian nobility were shocked at the queen's political meddling and believed that foreign women should not interfere in politics. Nevertheless, she played an instrumental role in leading Poland and Lithuania in repulsing the Swedish during the Swedish invasion of the Commonwealth, commonly known as the "Deluge". She attempted to change the voting system of the Polish Senate in order to grant the king more power, but she was unable to do so, as such actions threatened a rebellion of the upper classes that could have devastated the economy of the Commonwealth. Marie Louise opposed the Commonwealth's policy of religious toleration, believing that Poland was a "place of shelter for heretics" and wanted them burnt at the stake.

Marie Louise made use of bribery and false promises to the aristocracy in order to achieve her goals. She brought many noble ladies to the Polish-Lithuanian court from France who would be obliged to marry voivodes, princes and wealthy landowners and eventually serve as a defensive shield if the higher classes decided to rebel against the government, one of the most well-known examples of this strategy being her relative and favourite Klara Izabella Pacowa. Marie Louise also strongly followed French cultural patterns and introduced new French customs to the Commonwealth. She was known to wear only French clothing and to collect small memorabilia like coins, jewellery and perfume bottles, which was a common practice during the reign of Louis XIII and subsequently Louis XIV.

== Swedish invasion and hope for victory ==
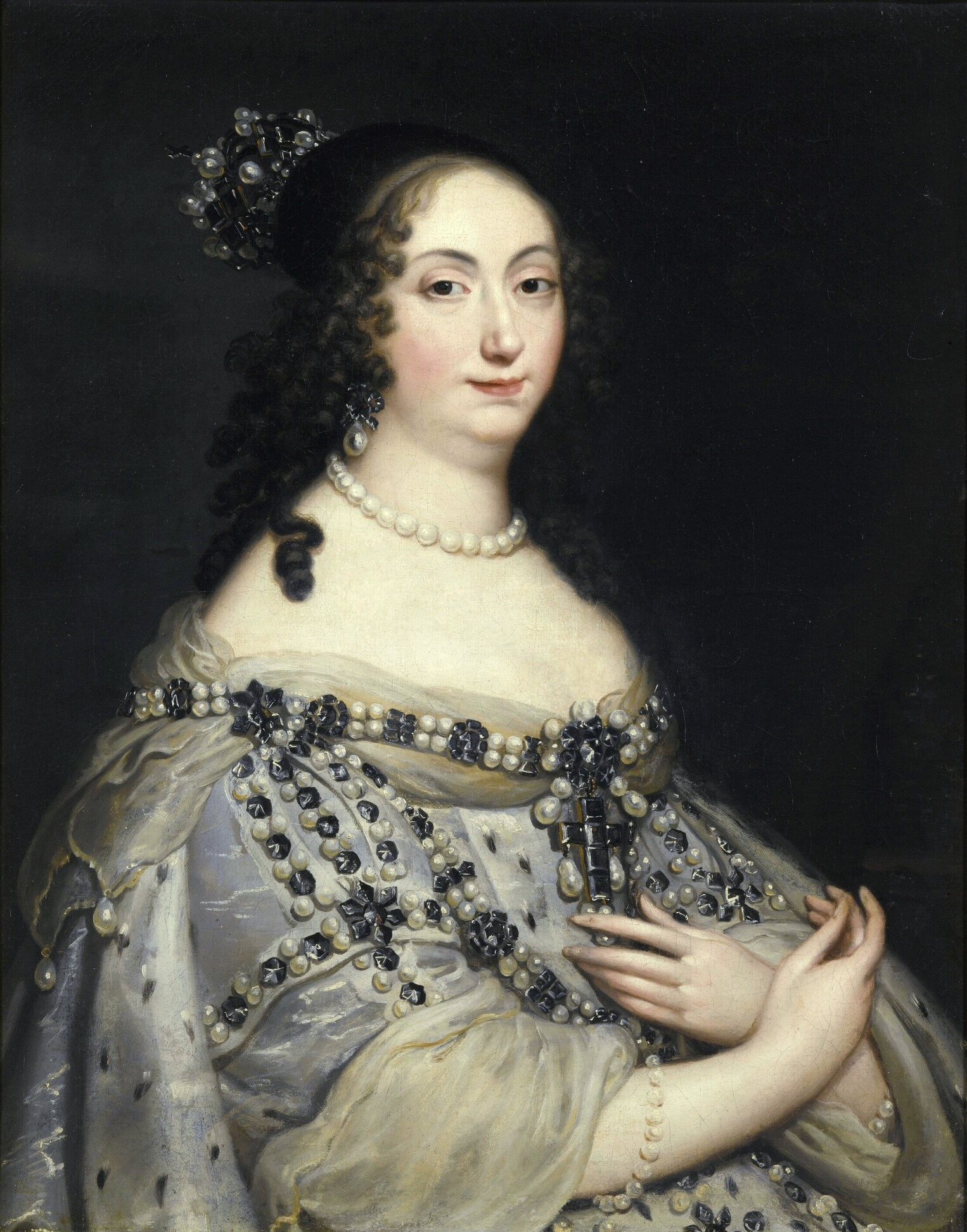
Portrait by Justus van Egmont. Among the Queen's jewels was a Polish Eagle set with small diamonds. After the queen's death her jewels were inherited by her sister Anne de Gonzague de Clèves.

Marie Louise's persistence, determination and courage were particularly highlighted during the Swedish invasion. After their defeat, she was forced to leave the capital, but she did not lose her faith in victory and went to Silesia, where she directed the army to fight against the invaders. She tirelessly worked to establish contact with all citizens who resisted the Swedes. Marie also developed an extensive diplomatic campaign aimed at receiving help from other European rulers and monarchs. To acquire the aid of the Habsburgs, she even considered handing over the Polish-Lithuanian throne after the death of John Casimir. She participated in settling the peace conditions with Sweden during negotiations for the Treaty of Oliwa.

During the invasion, the queen reached the peak of her popularity, but this quickly subsided after the presentation of draft reforms for strengthening royal power and election vivente rege (Latin meaning "for the life of the king"). At first, she used different methods to build up the party gathered around the court and started a propaganda campaign, which aimed to reform the public acceptance of the nobility. At the same time, she was determined for her niece, Anne Henriette of Bavaria, whose husband was to be Henri Jules, Prince of Condé, to be the wife of the next elected King of Poland and Grand Duke of Lithuania. This enraged the upper classes and nobles, who accused her of entangling the Commonwealth in French politics, which were hostile towards England, Sweden and allied Austria and Russia.

Success seemed certain, because the majority of senators supported her plans and opposed Jerzy Sebastian Lubomirski and the broader nobility. In addition, the peasants and lower classes' attitudes were reflected in the well-known rhyme "Bij Francuzów bij, wziąwszy dobry kij, wal Francuzów wal, wbijaj ich na pal!" (Beat the French, impale the French...). However, the dispute between the court and the opposition erupted in military confrontation when the Sejm sentenced Lubomirski to infamy and ordered the confiscation of his property. A proud magnate who believed that he would be elected the next king and grand duke, Lubomirski rejected their judgement and openly challenged King John II Casimir. In 1665, Lubomirski announced a rebellion, and his army entered the Commonwealth. On 13 July 1666, he faced the royal army under the King himself at Mątwy, and Lubomirski's forces were ultimately victorious.

In the aftermath of the battle, elite regiments of the royal Polish Army were executed by the rebels (in total, the army had lost almost 4,000 of its most experienced men). On 31 July, at the village of Legowice, the King and Lubomirski signed an armistice agreement. John II Casimir and Marie Louise were forced to give up their plans of reform and declared amnesty for the rebels, while Lubomirski signed a public letter of apology.

== Death and legacy ==
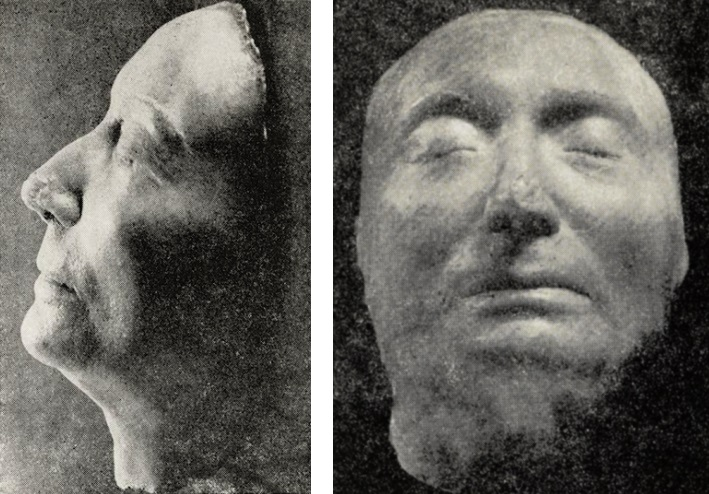
Death mask of Marie Louise.

The great effort put into the stabilization of the economy and the subsequent political disaster rapidly affected the health of the queen, who was suffering from fever, severe weight loss, constant coughing and a permanently bleeding nose. Lying on her deathbed, she ordered the servants and guards to not call for her husband, who was then busy taking part in an important Parliament session. Marie Louise died in Warsaw on 10 May 1667 and was buried in Kraków at Wawel Cathedral. John II Casimir, shocked by the sudden death of his wife and, in deep grief, abdicated the Polish-Lithuanian throne a year later.

Marie Louise founded the first Polish newspaper, Merkuriusz Polski (The Polish Mercury, 1661), and the first Polish convent of the Order of the Visitation of Holy Mary (1654). She supported Tito Livio Burattini, an Italian polymath (one of the first Egyptologists), who also designed "flying machines". He lived in Poland from the early 1650s. As a former salonist in France, she opened a literary salon in Poland, the first in the country. She was the patron of the next king and grand duke, John III Sobieski, who would follow the example of trying to reform the Commonwealth's legal system, also without success.

Rumours pointed her out as the mother of her successor as queen and grand duchess, Marie Casimire, through adultery, but there is no evidence to these rumours. She certainly had a close relationship with Marie Casimire, whom she educated on political matters and, according to Robert Nisbet Bain, spoiled her in the process. After Marie Louise had to give up her project of bringing Duke d'Enghien to Poland, she centred her hope on John III Sobieski and a marriage between her two protegés, which did come to pass.

The long reign of Marie Louise Gonzaga is poorly assessed by both contemporaries and historians. Together with Bona Sforza, she was one of the most energetic Polish queens and Lithuanian grand duchesses of the modern age and played an instrumental role in repulsing the Swedish armies during the Deluge, but her stubborn nature would ultimately frustrate her ambitious plans for reform.

== Gallery ==
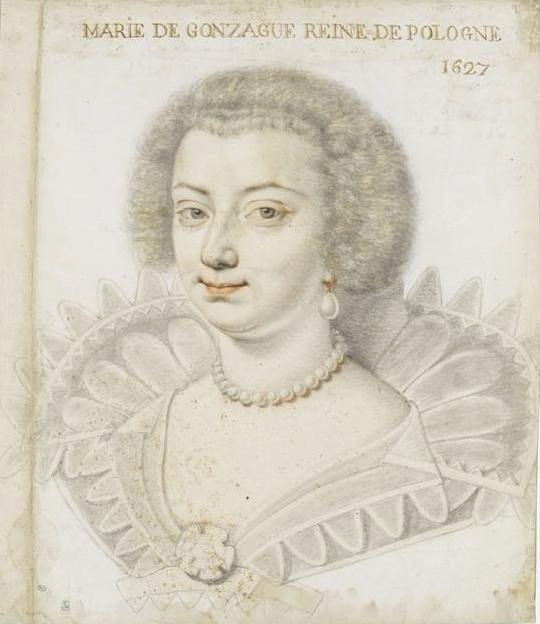
Marie Louise Gonzaga by Daniel Dumonstier, 1627

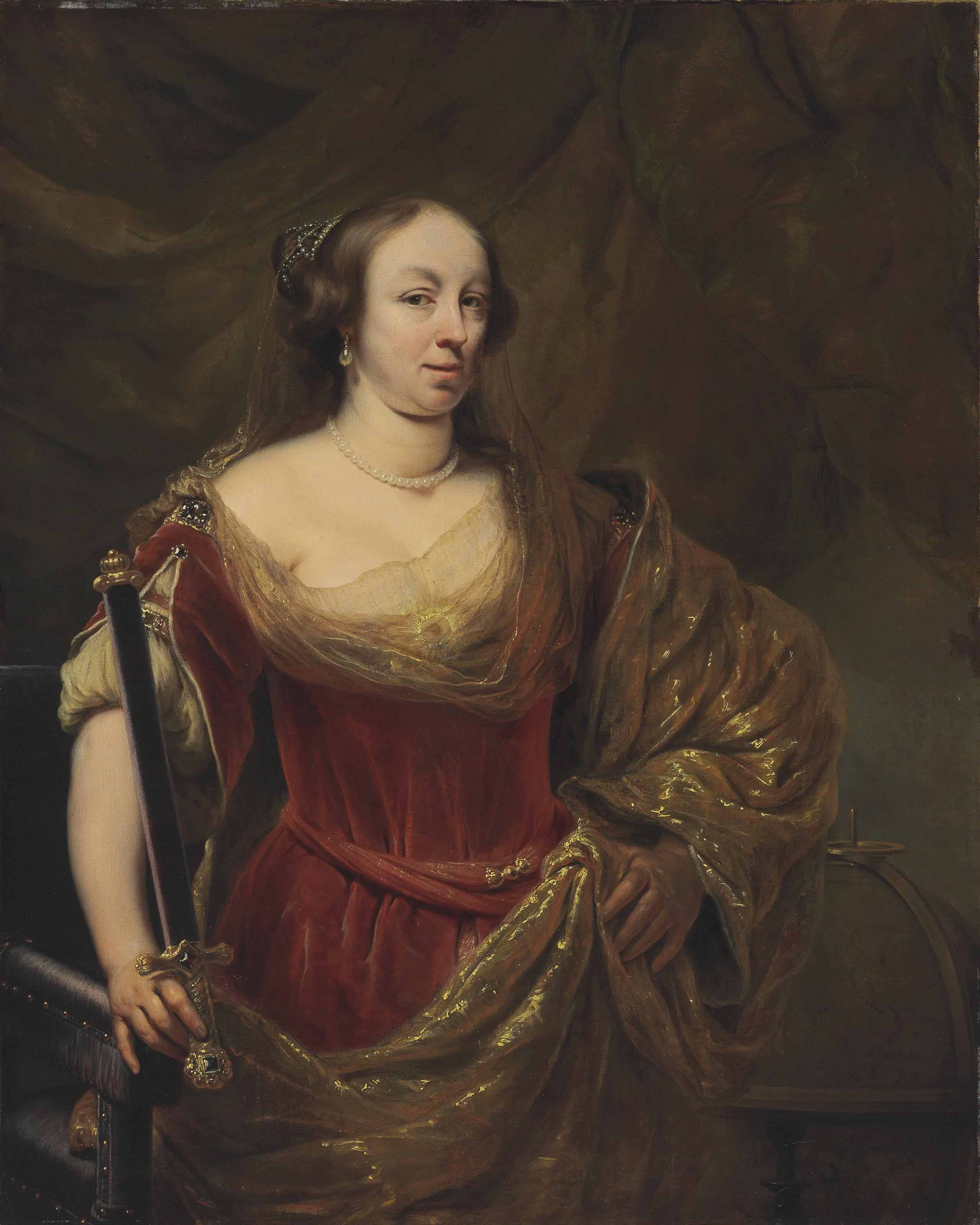
Portrait by Ferdinand Bol

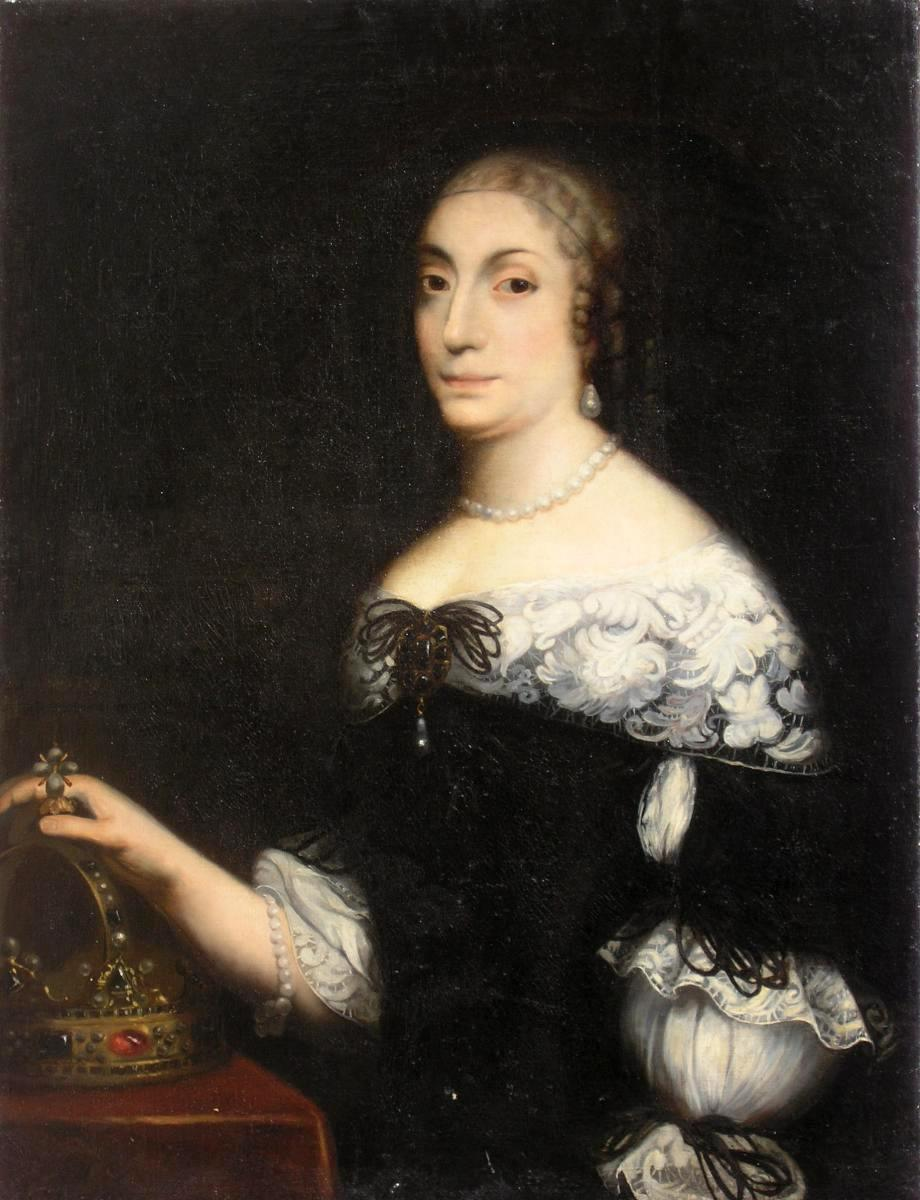
Portrait by Daniel Schultz

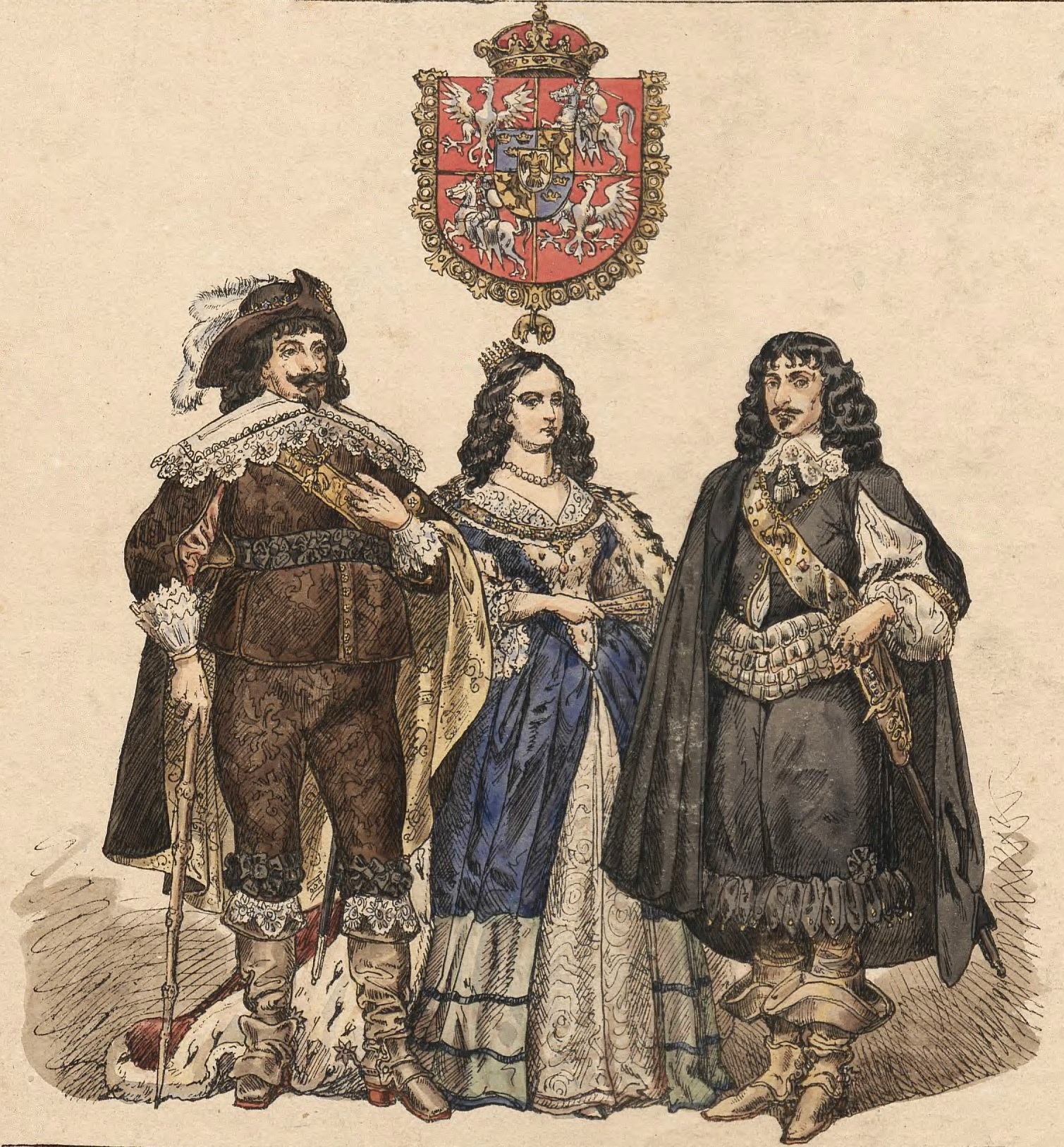
King Władysław and Prince John Casimir with Marie Louise

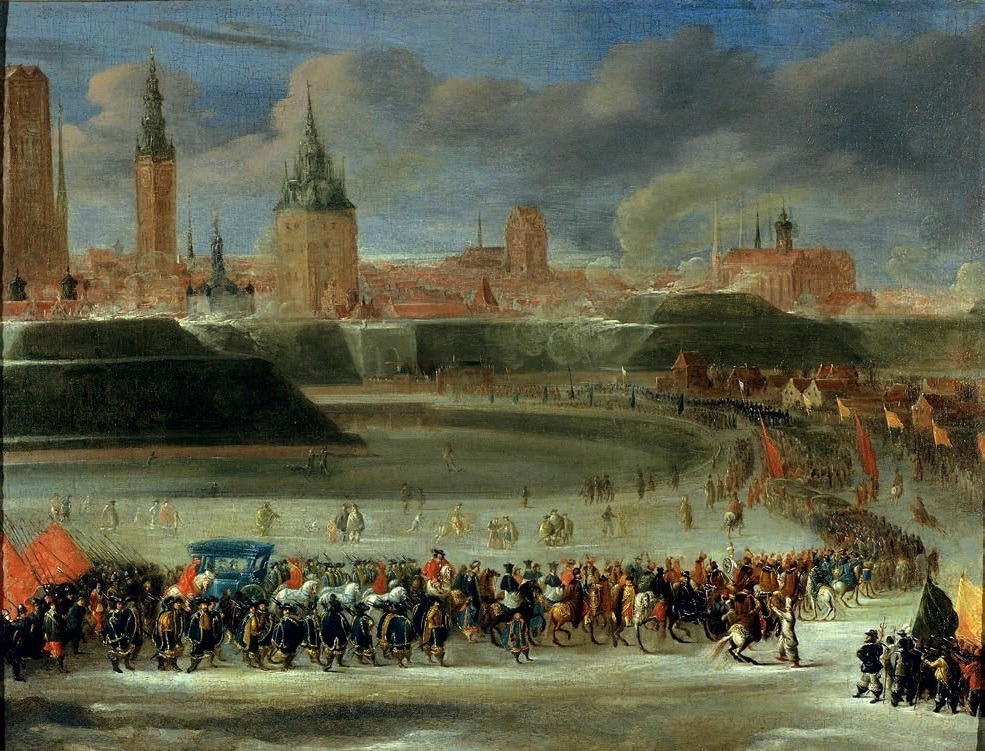
Entry of Queen Marie into Gdańsk

== See also ==
- Holy Cross Church
- Kazimierzowski Palace
- Ujazdów Castle
- Visitationist Church

== Sources ==
- Boltanski, Ariane (2006). Les ducs de Nevers et l'État royal: genèse d'un compromis (ca 1550 - ca 1600) (in French). Librairie Droz.
- Parrott, David (1997). "The Mantuan Succession, 1627–31: A Sovereignty Dispute in Early Modern Europe". The English Historical Review. CXII, Issue 445, February (445). Oxford Academic: 20–65. doi:10.1093/ehr/CXII.445.20.

Marie Louise Gonzaga House of Gonzaga Born: 18 August 1611 Died: 10 May 1667
Royal titles
Previous: Cecilia Renata of Austria	Queen consort of Poland; Grand Duchess consort of Lithuania; 1646–1667	Next: Eleonora Maria of Austria
