= Merkuriusz Polski Ordynaryjny =

First Polish newspaper

Merkuriusz Polski
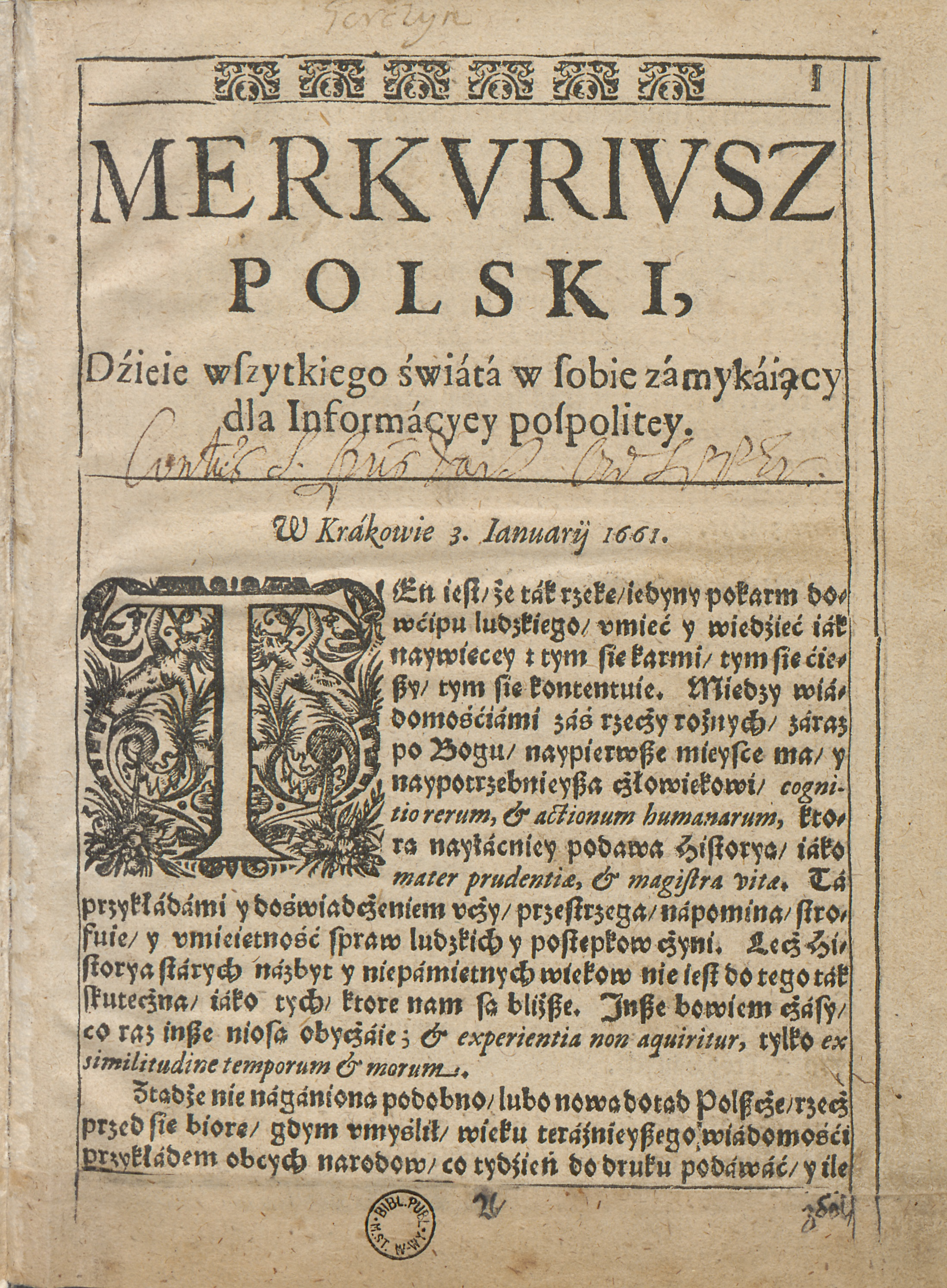
- Front page of Merkuriusz, no. 1, for 3 January 1661
- Founded: 1661
- Language: Polish
- Headquarters: Warsaw, Poland
- Circulation: 100-300

Merkuriusz Polski Ordynaryjny (The Polish Mercury Ordinary; original 17th-century Polish spelling: Merkuryusz Polski Ordynaryiny; full title: Merkuriusz Polski dzieje wszystkiego świata w sobie zamykający, dla informacji pospolitej: The Polish Mercury, Encompassing All the World's Affairs, for the Common Knowledge) was the first Polish newspaper, published from 1661, first in Kraków, then in Warsaw.

Though short-lived, it gave its name to several later newspapers, notably the Merkuriusz Polski published in London, 1955–58.

== History ==
Merkuryusz Polski Ordynaryiny first came out in Kraków on 3 January 1661. Sponsored by the court of King John II Casimir of Poland and his consort Queen Marie Louise Gonzaga, the newspaper was a weekly devoted chiefly to contemporary politics, European dynastic affairs, and monarchs' military campaigns. With regard to internal affairs, it promoted political reforms and the strengthening of monarchical power. Its demise was associated with the failure of the king's political plans.

Merkuryusz was edited in a 17th-century Polish heavily influenced by Latin; some parts of issues were written purely in Latin. Initially published by the Kraków printing house of J.A. Gorczyn (issues of 3 January – 4 May 1661), in May 1661 its editorial offices moved to Warsaw, where the issues from 14 May through 22 July 1661 appeared. Altogether 41 issues came out (12 of them "extraordinary," or special), with a run of 100–250 copies. The last issue was dated 22 July 1661.

Merkuryusz was edited by Hieronim Pinocci, an Italian merchant who had migrated to Poland and served in notable posts in the royal administration, including those of master of the Kraków mint and secretary to King John II Casimir. Other collaborators included Łukasz Opaliński.

Between 1933 and 1939 the complete run was reprinted by the Polish National Library.

== See also ==
- Mercurius Aulicus
- Mercurius Caledonius
- Monitor (Polish newspaper)
