= Claudine Françoise Mignot =

French adventuress (1624–1711)

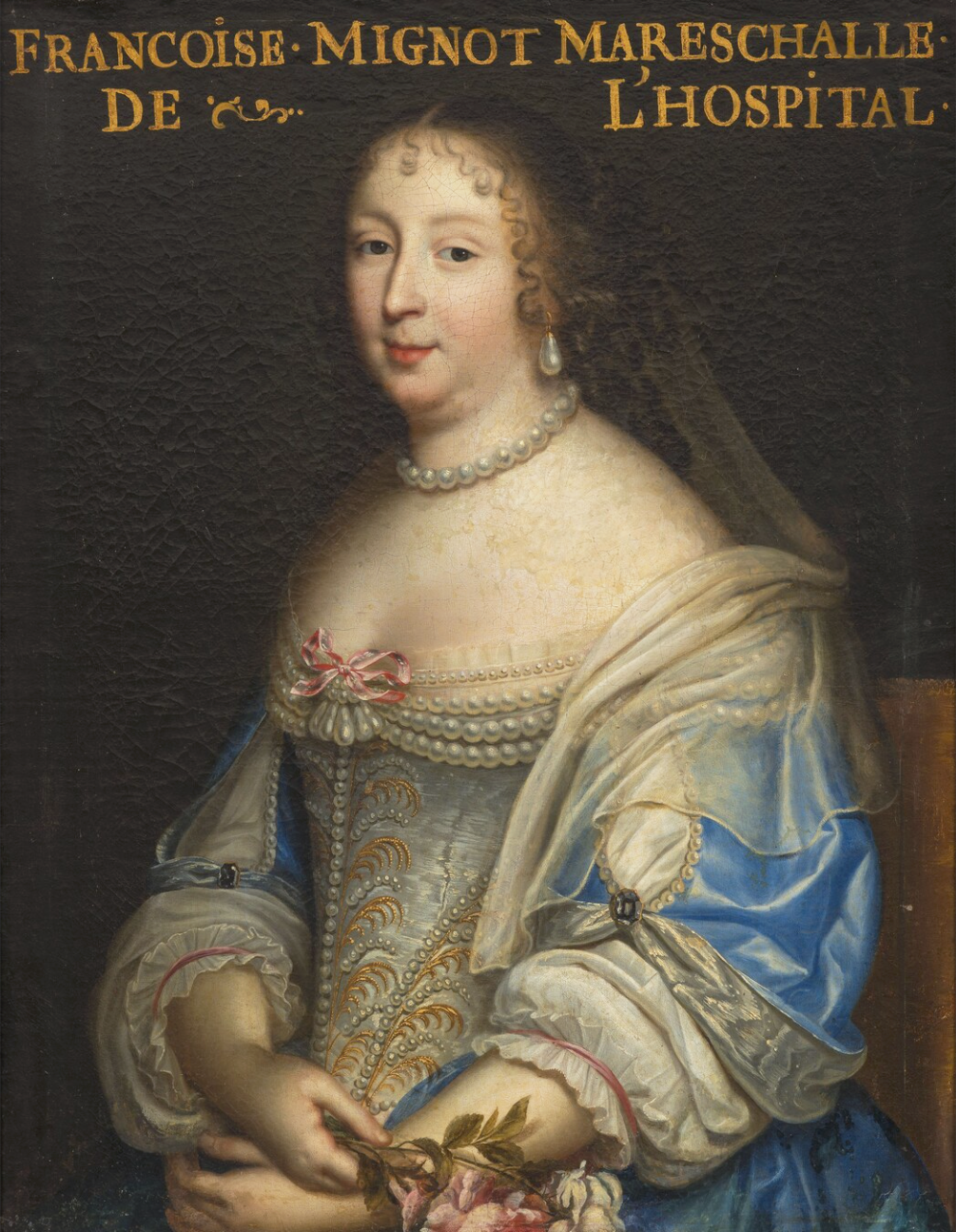
- Portrait of Claudine Françoise Mignot: Palace of Versailles
- Born: 20 January 1624; Meylan
- Died: 30 November 1711 (aged 87)
- Spouse(s): Pierre de Portes d'Amblérieu (m. 1640; div. 1653); François de l'Hôpital (m. 1653; d. 1660); John II, King of Poland (allegedly) (m. 1669/1672; d. 1672)
- Issue: Marie Catherine
- Occupation: French adventuress

Claudine Françoise Mignot (English: /miːˈnjoʊ/ mee-NYOH, French: [klodin fʁɑ̃swaz miɲo]; 20 January 1624 – 30 November 1711) was a French adventuress born near Grenoble, at Meylan. She was commonly called "Marie".

== Biography ==
At the age of sixteen, she attracted the notice of the secretary Pierre de Portes d'Amblérieu, treasurer of the province of Dauphiné, who promised to arrange her marriage. Instead, he married her himself on 29 July 1640 and left her his fortune. Immediately on her marriage with Pierre she had begun to educate herself, and her wealth and talents assured her a welcome in Paris.

His will was disputed by his family, and Claudine went to Paris in 1653 to secure its fulfilment. She sought the protection of François de l'Hôpital, marshal of France, then a man of seventy. He married her on 25 August 1653, within a week of their first meeting, and after seven years of marriage died on 20 April 1660, leaving her part of his estate. They had one son (c. 1654 – c. 1657).

She might had contracted a third and morganatic marriage with John Casimir, former king of Poland, during his stay in France in years 1669-1672. A few weeks before his sudden death, she received a third enormous fortune. In the testament, written on 12 December 1672 in Nevers, John Casimir called himself her debtor. They might have had one daughter named Marie Catherine, to whom John Casimir left fifteen thousand livres, and asked her to join the Order of the Visitation of Holy Mary.

She retired in her old age to a Carmelite convent, where she died on 30 November 1711. Her history was the subject of a play by Bayard and Paul Duport: Marie Mignot (1829).
