= John Sigismund Vasa =

Heir apparent to John II Casimir of Poland (1652)

- Born: 6 January 1652; Warsaw, Poland
- Died: 20 February 1652 (aged 0); Warsaw, Poland
- Burial: Wawel Castle, Kraków, Poland
- House: Vasa
- Father: John II Casimir Vasa
- Mother: Marie Louise Gonzaga

John Sigismund Vasa (6 January 1652 - 20 February 1652) was a Polish prince, the son of John II Casimir and Marie Louise Gonzaga.

== Biography ==
His parents had vowed that he would spend two years as the novice of the Order of the Discalced Carmelites. However, he died before the age of two months; his sister, Maria Anna Teresa, had also died some months before John's birth. He was buried in the Vasa Crypt, at Wawel Castle in the Tomb of the Kings.

According to contemporary sources, though his name was Charles Louis (Karol Ludwik), on his coffin his name was inscribed as Jan Zygmunt (John Sigismund).
