= Marie Catherine Vasa =

Daughter of former king of Poland (1670–after 1672)

Marie Catherine Vasa (c. 1670 – after 12 December 1672), was presumed daughter of the former King of Poland and Grand Duke of Lithuania, John Casimir Vasa, and his mistress and supposed morganatic wife, Claudine Françoise Mignot.

== Biography ==
Marie Catherine Vasa was born in 1670, in France. She is speculated to be child of John Casimir Vasa, and his wife; Claudine Françoise Mignot. On 12 December 1672, upon the death of her supposed father she gained 15.000 livres. In her adulthood, Marie obliged to her John Casimir's wishes, to become a nun and joined the Order of the Visitation of Holy Mary.

== Sources ==
- Zygmunt Wdowiszewski: Genealogia Jagiellonów i Domu Wazów w Polsce, Kraków 2005.
