= Maria Anna Vasa =

Polish princess (1650–1651)

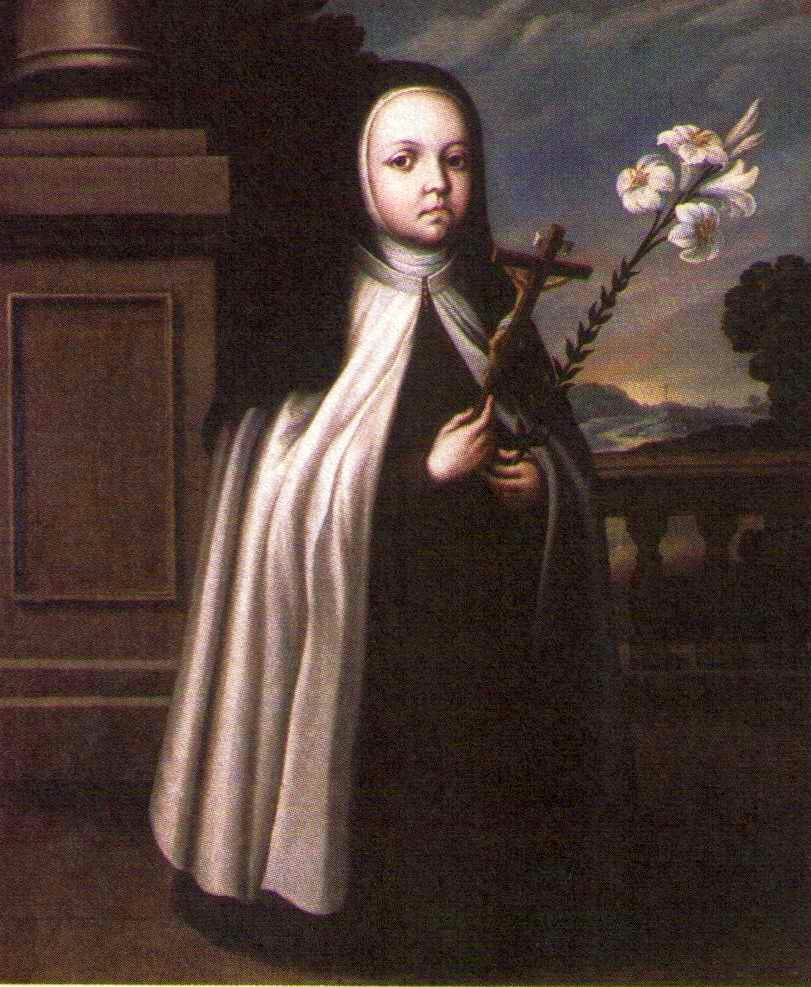
- Princess Maria Anna Theresa of Poland with the Carmelite habit, by Daniel Schultz, ca. 1651.
- Born: 1 July 1650; Warsaw, Poland
- Died: 1 August 1651 (aged 1); Warsaw, Poland
- Burial: Church of the Holy Spirit, later in Kazanowski Palace
Names
- Maria Anna Theresa Vasa
- House: Vasa
- Father: John II Casimir Vasa
- Mother: Marie Louise Gonzaga

Maria Anna Theresa Vasa (1 July 1650 – 1 August 1651), was a Polish-Lithuanian princess and a member of the House of Vasa.

Born in Warsaw, she was the eldest child and only daughter of John II Casimir Vasa, King of Poland and Grand Duke of Lithuania, by his wife Marie Louise Gonzaga.

== Life ==
The solemn baptism of the Princess took place on 2 August 1650 in St. John's Cathedral in Warsaw, her birthplace. Sacrament was performed by Maciej Łubieński, Primate of Poland. Her godparents were Ferdinand III, Holy Roman Emperor (for whom Prince Karol Ferdynand Vasa stood proxy) and his recently new consort Eleonora Gonzaga (for whom the Princess Theodora Christine Sapieha stood proxy), and Pope Innocent X (represented by Nuncio Giovanni de Torres).

Since her birth, Maria Anna was destined to enter in the Carmelite Order because her parents were devoted Catholics and planned this for her. Soon her preparation for this began, but she suddenly died aged thirteen months in Warsaw.

Maria Anna's funeral took place on 12 August 1651 in the Church of the Carmelite sisters in Warsaw. The little princess was buried in a carmelite habit at the great altar. Her remains were changed from location several times. In 1652, placed in a golden coffin, she was moved to Church of the Holy Spirit, and in 1663 was finally placed under the altar of the Carmelite convent in the old Kazanowski Palace, where the Charitable Center Res Sacra Miser stands today.
