= John II Casimir Vasa =

Ruler of Poland–Lithuania from 1648 to 1668

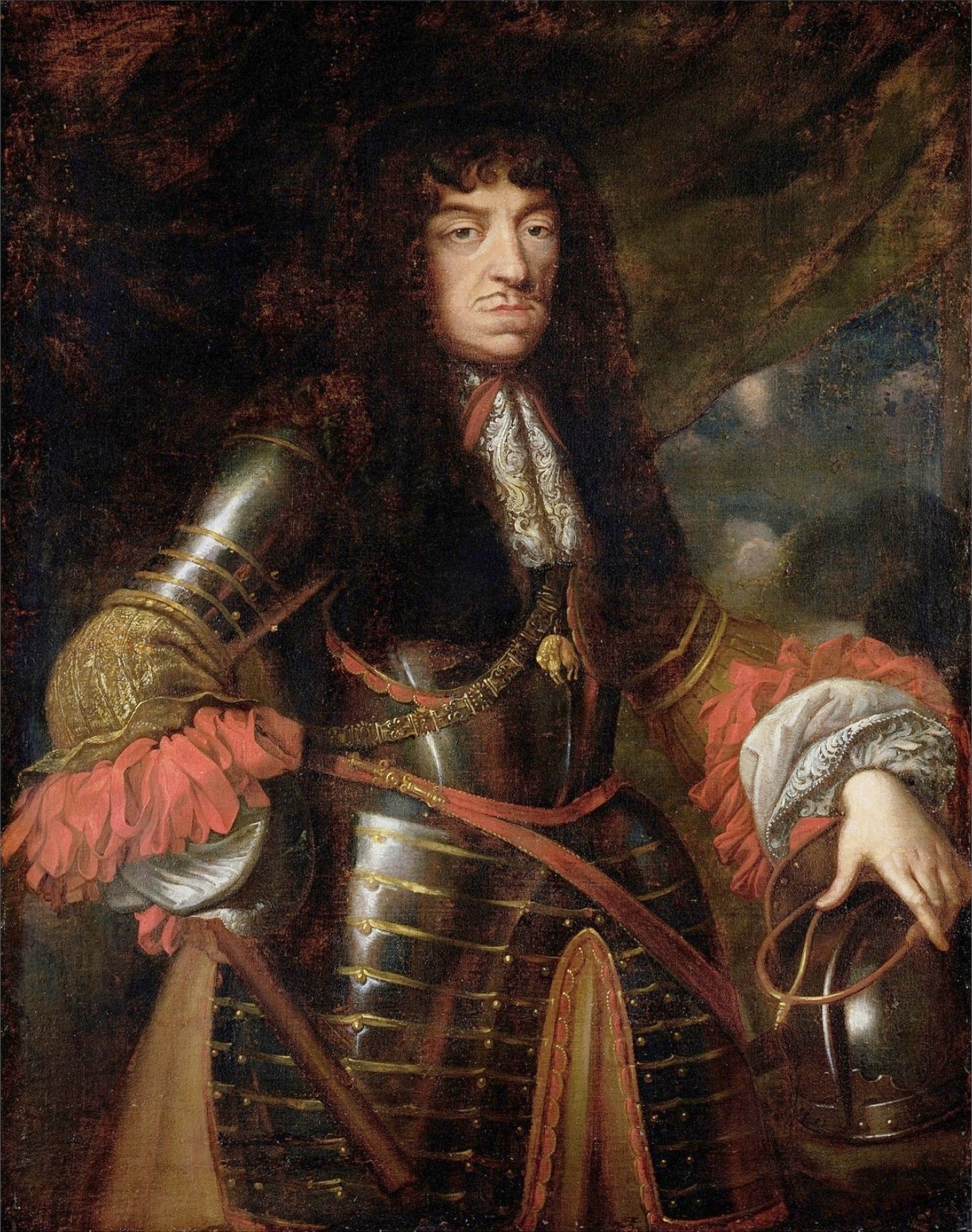
- Portrait by Daniel Schultz, c. 1658

King of Poland Grand Duke of Lithuania
- Reign: November 1648 – 16 September 1668
- Coronation: 19 January 1649
- Predecessor: Władysław IV Vasa
- Successor: Michael Korybut Wiśniowiecki
- Born: 22 March 1609; Kraków, Polish–Lithuanian Commonwealth
- Died: 16 December 1672 (aged 63); Nevers, Kingdom of France
- Burial: 31 January 1676; Wawel Cathedral, Kraków (body); Abbey of Saint-Germain-des-Prés, Paris (heart)
- Spouses: Marie Louise Gonzaga (m. 1649; died 1667): Claudine Françoise Mignot (allegedly)
- Issue: Maria Anna Theresa; John Sigismund; Marie Catherine?
- House: Vasa
- Father: Sigismund III Vasa
- Mother: Constance of Austria
- Religion: Catholic
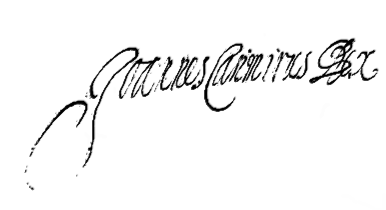
- Signature

John II Casimir Vasa (Polish: Jan II Kazimierz Waza; Lithuanian: Jonas Kazimieras Vaza; 22 March 1609 – 16 December 1672) was King of Poland and Grand Duke of Lithuania from 1648 to his abdication in 1668 as well as a claimant to the throne of Sweden from 1648 to 1660. He was the first son of Sigismund III Vasa with his second wife Constance of Austria. John Casimir succeeded his older half-brother, Władysław IV Vasa.

As a prince, John Casimir embarked at Genoa for Spain in 1638 to negotiate a league with Philip IV of Spain against France, but was captured by Cardinal Richelieu and imprisoned at Vincennes, where he remained for two years. He was released when his brother, Władysław IV Vasa, promised never to wage war against France. John Casimir then travelled extensively throughout Western Europe and entered the order of Jesuits in Rome in 1643. He was made cardinal by Innocent X, but after returning to Poland, he became a layman and succeeded his brother in 1648. His reign commenced amid the confusion and disasters caused by the great revolt of the Cossacks under Bohdan Khmelnytsky in Ukraine, who had advanced into the very heart of Poland. The power of the king had been stripped of almost all its prerogatives by the growing influence of the nobles.

The Tsardom of Russia and Sweden, which had long been active enemies of Poland, renewed their attacks. George II Rakoczy of Transylvania also invaded the Polish territory, and the Sejm was continuously dissolved because of the abuse of the liberum veto law. Charles X Gustav of Sweden triumphantly marched through the country and occupied Kraków in 1655, which forced John Casimir to flee to Silesia. The Swedes were eventually stopped by Stefan Czarniecki under Częstochowa. The wars against the Swedes and the Russians were terminated by treaties involving considerable cessions of provinces on the Baltic and the Dnieper on the part of Poland, which also lost its sway over the cossacks, who placed themselves under the protection of Russian Tsars. During the long battles, John Casimir, though feeble and of a peaceful disposition, frequently proved his patriotism and courage.

The intrigues of his wife for the Duke of Enghien as successor to the Polish throne triggered a series of revolts, including a rebellion under Hetman Jerzy Sebastian Lubomirski. As a result, John II Casimir abdicated at the Sejm of Warsaw on 16 September 1668. The following year, he retired to France, where he was hospitably treated by Louis XIV. John II Casimir's reign was one of the most disastrous in the history of Poland. He was the third and last monarch on the Polish throne from the House of Vasa.

== Royal titles ==
Official titles:

Latin: Ioannes Casimirus, Dei Gratia Rex Poloniae, Magnus Dux Lithuaniae, Russiae, Prussiae, Masoviae, Samogitiae, Kijoviae, Volhiniae, Livoniae, Severiae, Podlachiae, Smolenscie, Czernichoviaeque; nec non Suecorum, Gothorum et Vandalorumque haereditarius Rex, etc.

English translation:

John Casimir, by the Grace of God, King of Poland, Grand Duke of Lithuania, Ruthinia, Prussia, Mazovia, Samogitia, Kiev, Volhynia, Livonia, Severia, Smolensk, Chernigov; and also hereditary King of Sweden, the Goths and the Wends. (Note: In 1661 John II Casimir was granted the style of Orthodox Majesty by Pope Alexander VII for him and his successors, as a reward for the expulsion of the Socinians from the Polish lands by the Sejm in 1658.)

== Biography ==
=== Early life, family and rise to power ===
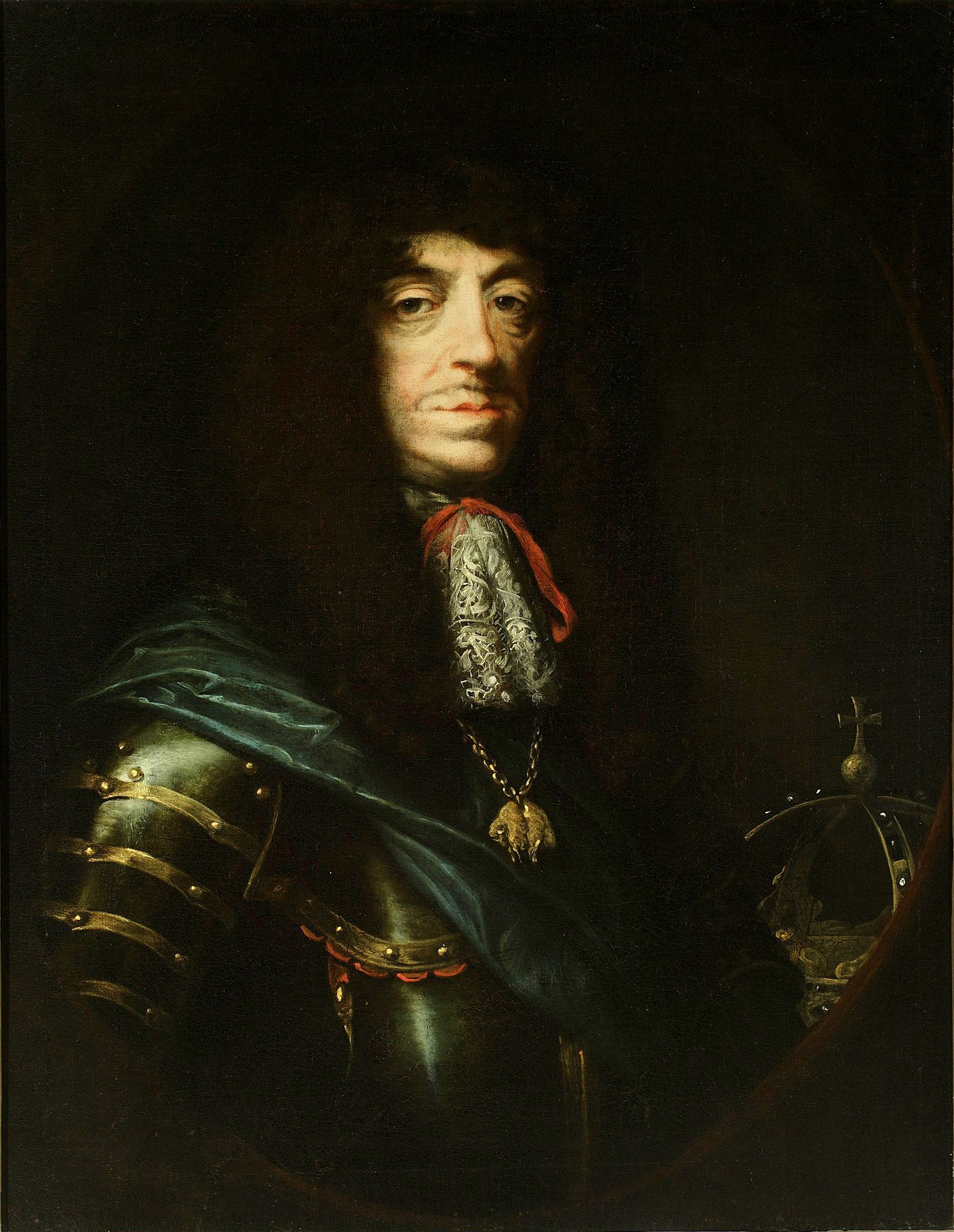
Portrait by Daniel Schultz, c. 1667

John Casimir was born in Kraków on 22 March 1609, the son of Sigismund III Vasa and Constance of Austria. His father, Sigismund III, the grandson of Gustav Vasa, had in 1592 succeeded his own father to the Swedish throne, only to be deposed in 1599 by his uncle, Charles IX of Sweden. This led to a long-standing feud wherein the Polish kings of the House of Vasa claimed the Swedish throne, resulting in the Polish–Swedish War of 1600–1629. Poland and Sweden were also on opposite sides in the Thirty Years' War (1618–1648), although in that conflict, Poland for the most part avoided joining any major military actions and campaigns, instead supporting the Austrian Habsburg and Catholic faction.

John Casimir, for most of his life, remained in the shadow of his older half-brother, Władysław IV Vasa. He had few friends among the Polish nobility. Unfriendly, secretive, dividing his time between lavish partying and religious contemplation, and disliking politics, he did not have a strong power base nor influence at the Polish court, instead supporting unpopular Habsburg policies. He did, however, display talent as a military commander, showing his abilities in the Smolensk War against Muscovy (1633).

Between 1632 and 1635, Władysław IV sought to improve his brother's influence by negotiating a marriage for John Casimir to Christina of Sweden, then to an Italian princess, but to no avail. In 1637, John Casimir undertook a diplomatic mission to Vienna, which he abandoned to join the army of the Holy Roman Empire and fight against the French. After his regiment was defeated in battle, he spent a year living lavishly at the Viennese court, where his strong anti-Cossack interests and political views were greatly shaped under the direct influence of the Austrian Emperor.

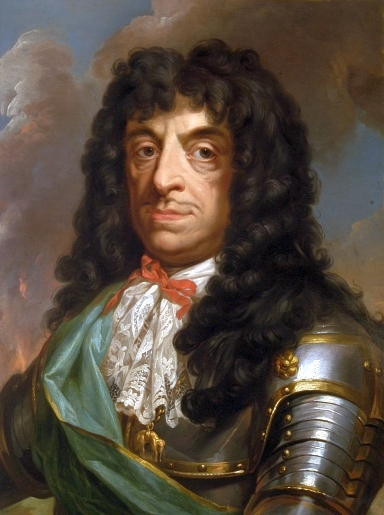
Posthumous portrait by Bacciarelli, 18th century

In 1636, he returned to the Polish–Lithuanian Commonwealth and fell in love with one Baroness Guldentern, but his desire to marry her was thwarted by King Władysław. As an apology, Władysław attempted to make him the sovereign of the Duchy of Courland, but this was vetoed by the Commonwealth parliament (Sejm). John Casimir took offense to this slight by the parliament, and in 1638 left for the Kingdom of Spain to become Viceroy of Portugal, but was captured by French agents and imprisoned by the order of Cardinal Richelieu until 1640. He was then freed by a diplomatic mission of the appointed Voivode of Smolensk, Krzysztof Gosiewski and as a result of anti-French Polish-Spanish negotiations.

In 1641, John Casimir decided to become a Jesuit, leaving the Polish–Lithuanian Commonwealth to accompany his sister to Germany. In 1643, he joined the Jesuits, despite vocal opposition from King Władysław, causing a diplomatic rift between the Commonwealth and the Pope. John Casimir went to Rome upon an invitation from the Jesuits in order to bolster the Catholic faction. He was appointed cardinal, but he would soon resign and return to the Commonwealth when the only son of Władysław died. He attempted to gain the support of the Habsburgs and marry an Austrian princess to create an alliance between the nations in case of an unexpected attack from the east.

=== King of Poland ===
Polish–Lithuanian Commonwealth in 1648

Polish–Lithuanian Commonwealth in 1660

In 1648, John Casimir was elected by the Polish Parliament to succeed his half-brother on the Polish throne. A year later, John II Casimir married his brother's widow, Marie Louise Gonzaga (Polish: Maria Ludwika), who would prove to be a major support to the King.

The reign of the last of the Vasas in the Polish–Lithuanian Commonwealth would be dominated by the Russo-Polish War (1654–67), followed by the war with Sweden ("The Deluge"), the scene for which had been set by the Commonwealth's two previous Vasa kings. Most of Poland was invaded by the Swedish army during The Deluge without much of a fight, due to the complicity of the Polish and Lithuanian governors and nobility. In the course of a few years, the Commonwealth rose to force the Swedes out of Poland, ending the short-lived intrusions and campaigns, however, at a high cost. Most of the cities and towns in the Commonwealth were sacked, plundered and some were burnt to the ground, mostly by the retreating enemy units. Although the reign of John II Casimir is remembered as one of the most disastrous and perhaps most unsuccessful in the history of Poland and the Polish-Lithuanian Commonwealth, he is often referred to as the "warrior king" who fought bravely to save his nation and his people.

In 1660, John II Casimir was forced to renounce his claim to the Swedish throne and acknowledge Swedish sovereignty over Livonia and the city of Riga in modern-day Latvia.

=== Abdication and death ===
Polish-Lithuanian Commonwealth at the time of his abdication in 1667

On 16 September 1668, grief-stricken after the death of his wife in the previous year, John II Casimir abdicated the throne of the Polish-Lithuanian Commonwealth and returned to France, where he rejoined the Jesuits and became abbot of Abbey of Saint-Germain-des-Prés in Paris. Following his abdication, Michał Korybut Wiśniowiecki was elected the new king and was crowned on 29 September 1669. John Casimir allegedly re-married to Claudine Françoise Mignot.

In the autumn of 1672, John Casimir had intended to return to Poland, but fell ill before departing and was prevented from doing so. The seizure of Kamieniec Podolski by the Ottoman Empire distressed him, exacerbating his condition. He requested the assistance of Pope Clement X to defend Poland against the Ottomans. He died on 16 December 1672 from apoplexy, and his burial took place inside the Wawel Cathedral in Kraków. His heart was interred in the Abbey of Saint-Germain-des-Prés.

== The Lwów Oath ==
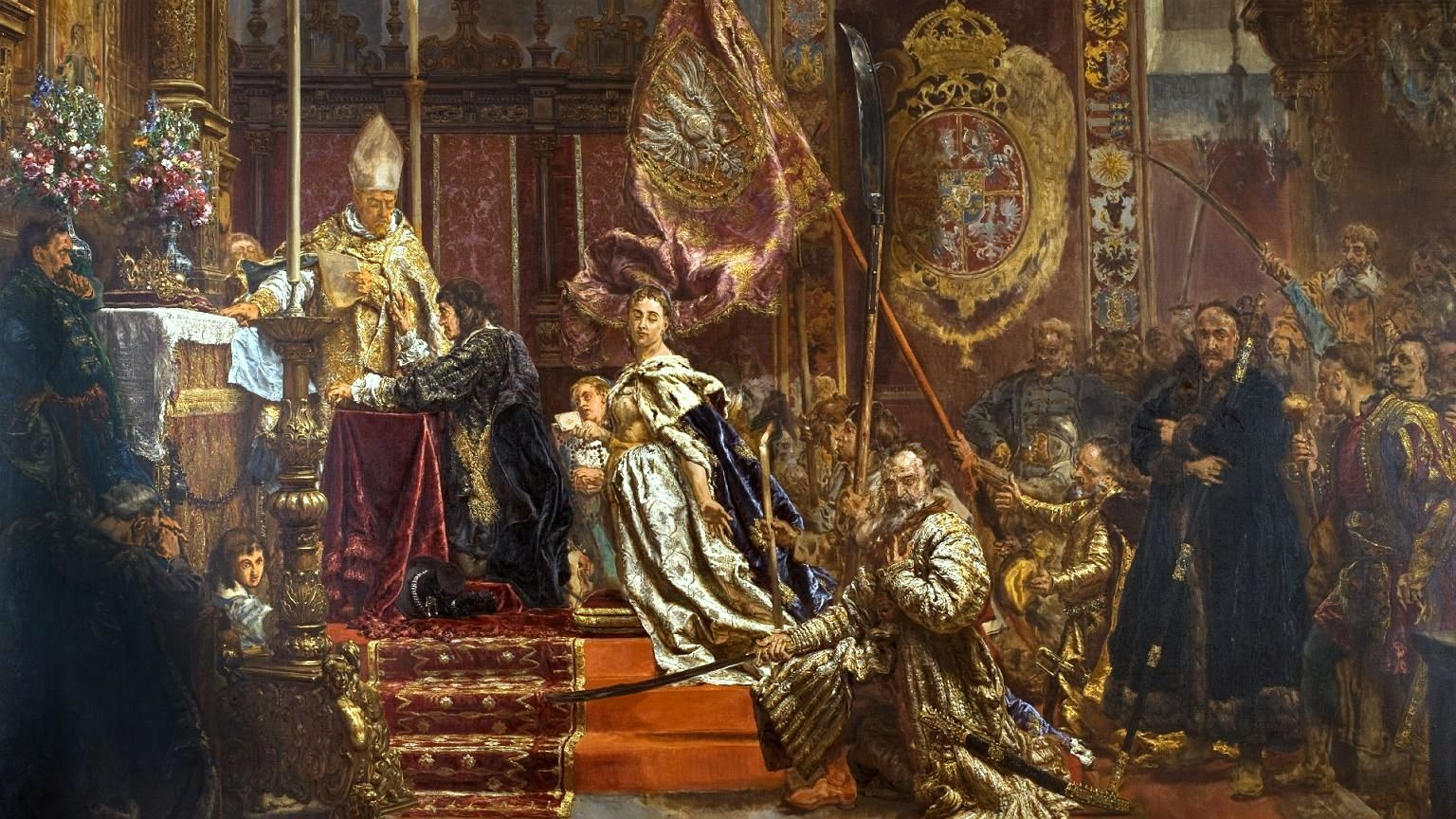
Lwów Oath, by Jan Matejko, National Museum in Wrocław

On 1 April 1656, during a Mass in the Latin Cathedral in Lwów, conducted by the papal legate Pietro Vidoni, John II Casimir in a grandiose and elaborate ceremony entrusted the Commonwealth under the protection of the Blessed Virgin Mary, whom he announced as The Queen of the Polish Crown and other of his countries. He also swore to protect the Kingdom's folk from any impositions and unjust bondage. This is referred to as the Lwów Oath.

As almost the whole country was occupied by Swedish or Russian armies, the vow was intended to incite the whole nation, including the peasantry, to rise up against the invaders. Two main issues raised by the king in the vows were the necessity to protect the Catholic faith, seen as endangered by the Lutheran (and to some extent Orthodox) aggressors, and to manifest the will to improve the condition of the peasantry.

After the King, a similar vow was taken by the Deputy Chancellor of the Crown and the bishop of Kraków, Andrzej Trzebicki, in the name of the szlachta noblemen of the Commonwealth.

The Commonwealth forces finally drove back the Swedes in 1657 and the Russians in 1661. After the war, promises made by John Casimir in Lwów, especially those considering the peasants' lot, were not fulfilled, mostly because of objections by the Sejm, which represented the szlachta nobility and was not attracted to the idea of reducing serfdom, which would negatively affect their economic interests.

== Legacy ==
John Casimir left no surviving children (unless Marie Catherine was his daughter). He was the penultimate member of the line of Bona Sforza, outlived by his half-nephew Władysław Konstanty Vasa. With him, all the legitimate issue of Alfonso II of Naples died out. His heir in Ferdinand I of Naples and in the Brienne succession was his distant cousin, Henry de La Tremoille, Prince of Talmond and Taranto, the heir-general of Frederick IV of Naples (second son of Ferdinand I of Naples and Isabella of Clermont), who also was the heir-general of Federigo's first wife, Anne of Savoy.

John II Casimir was, after his brother, the head of the genealogical line of St Bridget of Sweden, descending in primogeniture from Bridget's sister. After his death, the headship was offered to his second cousin, the already-abdicated Christina I of Sweden.

== Patron of the arts ==
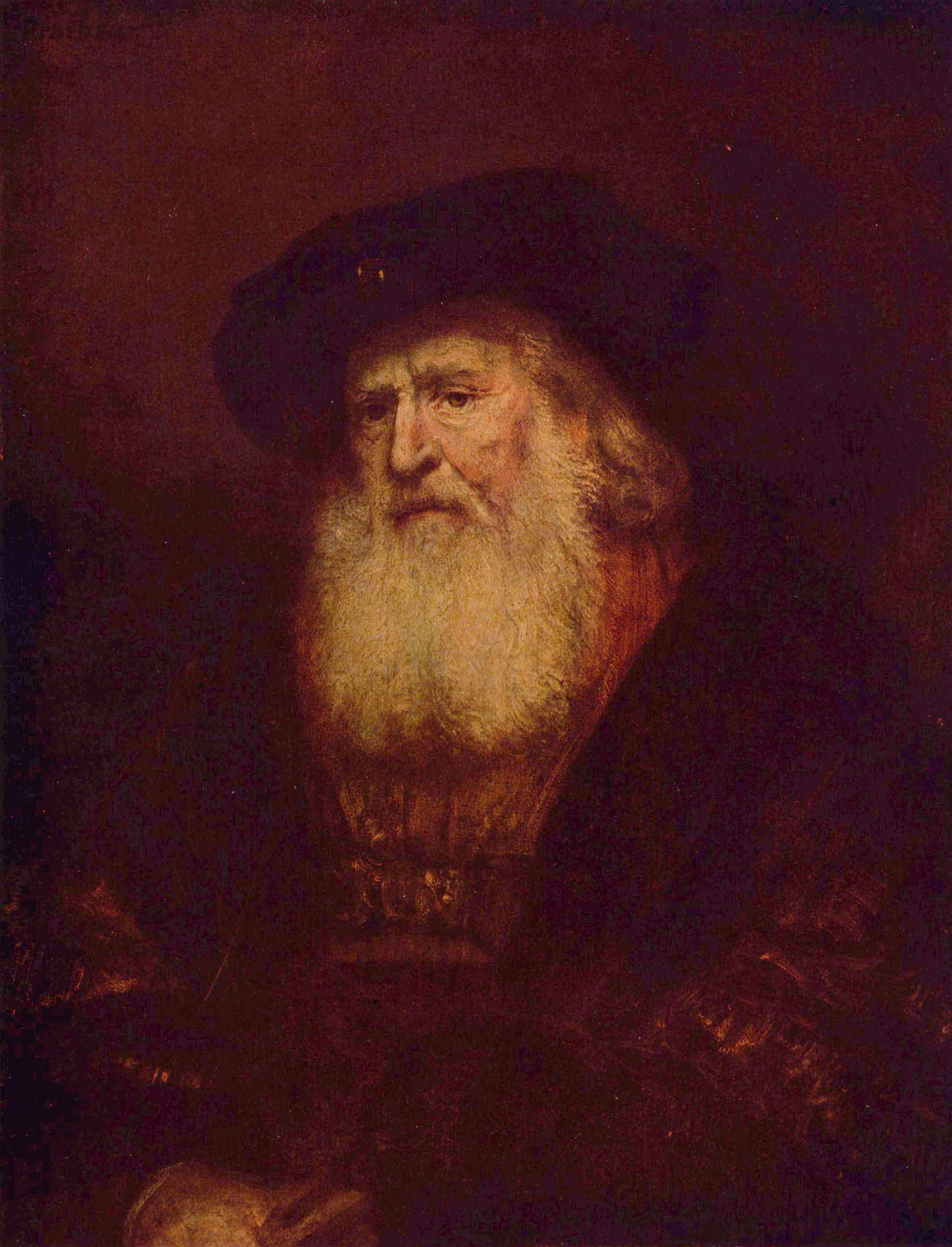
Portrait of a Rabbi, by Rembrandt

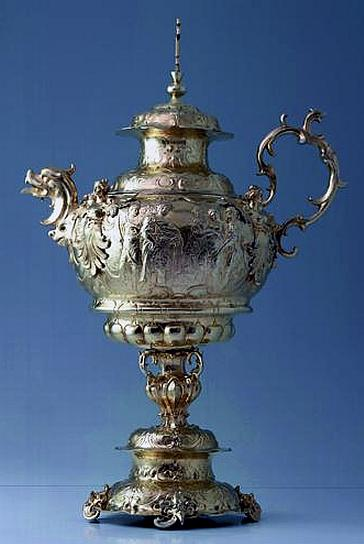
A silver ewer from 1640 commissioned by John Casimir

The vast collection of paintings, portraits, porcelain and other valuables belonging to the Polish Vasas was mostly looted by the Swedes and Germans of Brandenburg who brutally sacked Warsaw in the 1650s, during the Deluge. Most of them were sold off to wealthy nobles, displayed in other parts of Europe, or would eventually belong to private collectors, though some of the famous works survived hidden in Opole like The Rape of Europa by Guido Reni.

The most important additions to the royal collection were made by John II Casimir, a passionate collector of Dutch paintings, and a patron of Daniel Schultz (who painted a famous portrait of a son of Crimean Aga Dedesh, and was made Royal falconer in reward for his father's contribution during the war with Russia in 1663). A major part of the king's painting collection was acquired in the 1660s by way of Hendrick van Uylenburgh, an agent in Amsterdam, and later his son Gerrit van Uylenburgh. These were mainly Dutch paintings and works by Rembrandt. The collection also included works by Rubens, Jordaens, Reni, Guercino, Jan Brueghel the Younger, and Bassano, among others.

When John II Casimir abdicated the Polish–Lithuanian throne, he brought many of his paintings and portraits with him to France. The collection remaining at Royal Castle in Warsaw was looted during the Great Northern War or appropriated in 1720 by Augustus II the Strong, Elector of Saxony, like two paintings by Rembrandt – Portrait of a Rabbi (1657) and Portrait of a Man in the Hat Decorated with Pearls (1667), today displayed in the Gemäldegalerie Alte Meister in Dresden, Germany.

== In fiction ==
John Casimir was a character in Henryk Sienkiewicz's novels With Fire and Sword (Ogniem i Mieczem) and The Deluge (Potop).

== Ancestry ==
Ancestors of John II Casimir Vasa

8. Gustav I of Sweden
4. John III of Sweden
9. Margaret Leijonhufvud
2. Sigismund III of Poland
10. Sigismund I of Poland
5. Catherine of Poland
11. Bona Sforza
1. John II Casimir of Poland
12. Ferdinand I, Holy Roman Emperor
6. Charles II, Archduke of Austria
13. Anne of Bohemia and Hungary
3. Constance of Austria
14. Albert V, Duke of Bavaria
7. Duchess Maria Anna of Bavaria
15. Archduchess Anna of Austria

== See also ==
- History of Poland (1569–1795)

== Notes ==
John II Casimir Vasa House of Vasa Born: 22 March 1609 Died: 6 December 1672
Regnal titles
Preceded by Władysław IV Vasa	King of Poland; Grand Duke of Lithuania; 1648 – 1668	Succeeded by Michael Korybut Wiśniowiecki
Titles in pretence
Preceded by Władysław IV Vasa	— TITULAR — King of Sweden; 1648 – 1660	Treaty of Oliva
Preceded by Władysław IV Vasa	Brienne claim 1648 – 1672	Succeeded by Henri de La Trémoille
