= John von Collas =

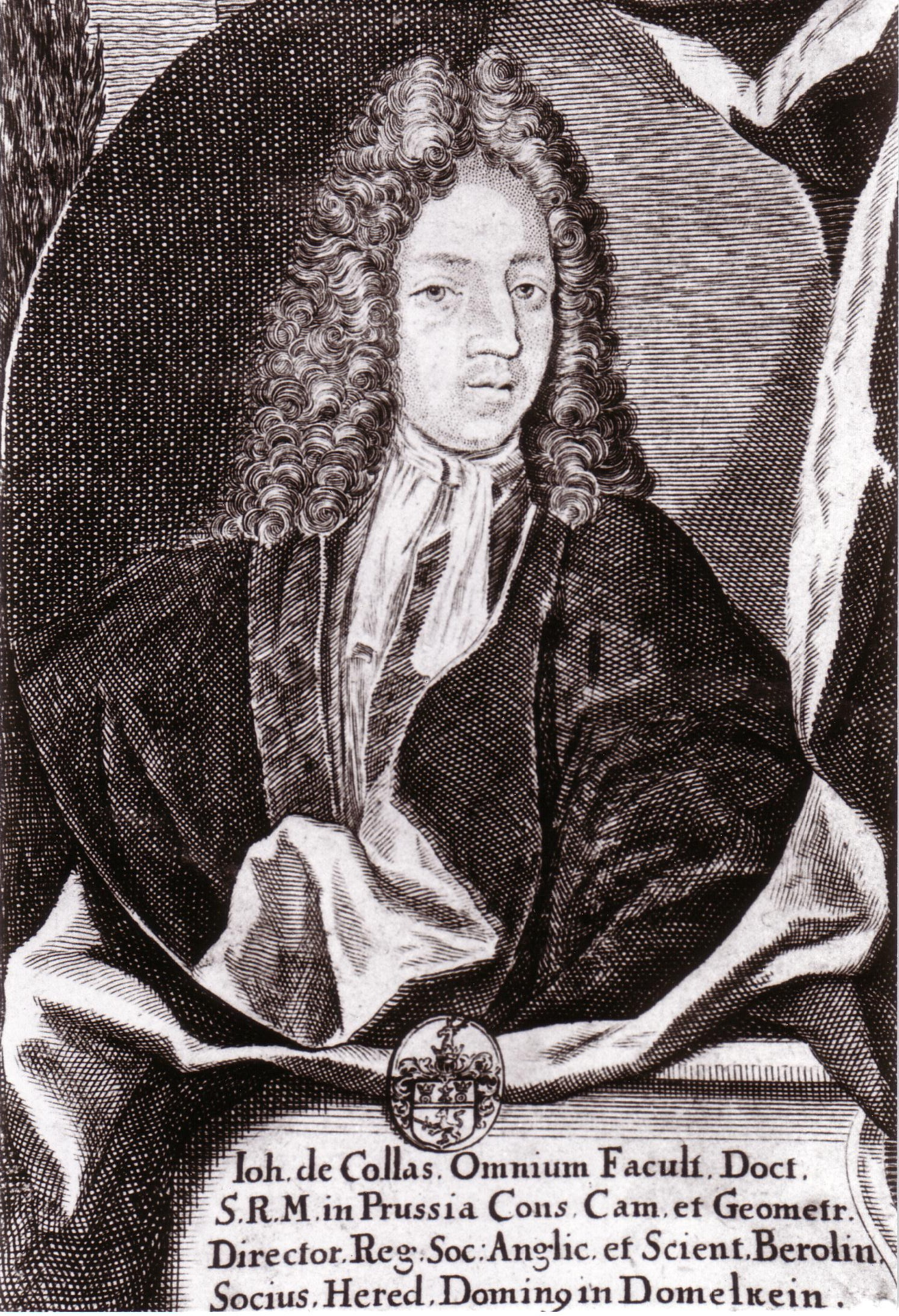
- John von Collas
- Born: 11 November 1678; Sedan, France
- Died: 16 June 1753 (aged 74); Weißenstein near Gutenfeld, district of Königsberg, East Prussia
- Other names: Jean de Collas
- Occupation: architect
- Spouse: Charlotte Pelet (27 February 1700 – 29 December 1751)
- Children: Charlotte Maria Rahel von Collas (1723–1794); Johann Jakob von Collas (1721–1792)

John von Collas born Jean de Collas (11 November 1678 – 16 June 1753) was a late Baroque architect of the 18th century.

== Biography ==
Collas was born in Sedan to Antoine de Collas (died 1693) and Elisabeth née de Vilain (died 1681). He was a French Huguenot, his father was a counsellor of William III of Orange, the later William III of England.

After the Edict of Fontainebleau of 1685 the family was forced to flee from France and moved to the Netherlands and further to London in 1688. Collas grew up at the estates of William Russell, 1st Duke of Bedford and became a Page of Russell’s Granddaughter Mary Butler (1646–1707), he carried the train of Mary II of England (1662–1694) at her coronation in 1689.

Aged 22, John von Collas was a member of the Royal Society and started a journey to Asia. Initially on his way through he arrived in Königsberg in autumn 1701 and decided to stay in East Prussia. He became a Royal Prussian Engineer, counsellor, director of the Geometer and respected scholar. He was involved in the design of the Wesel citadel. He was mentioned as a member of the Prussian Academy of Sciences in 1704.

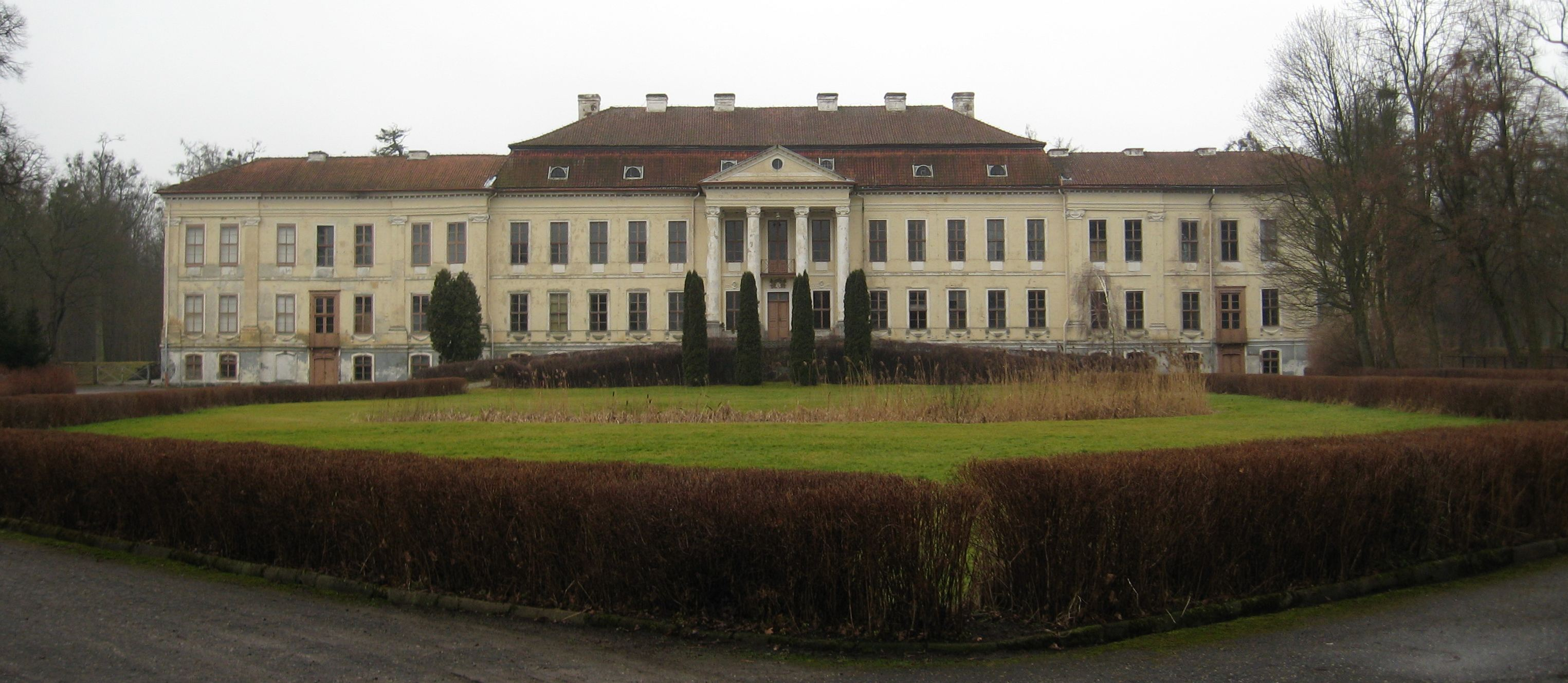
Dönhoffstädt Palace

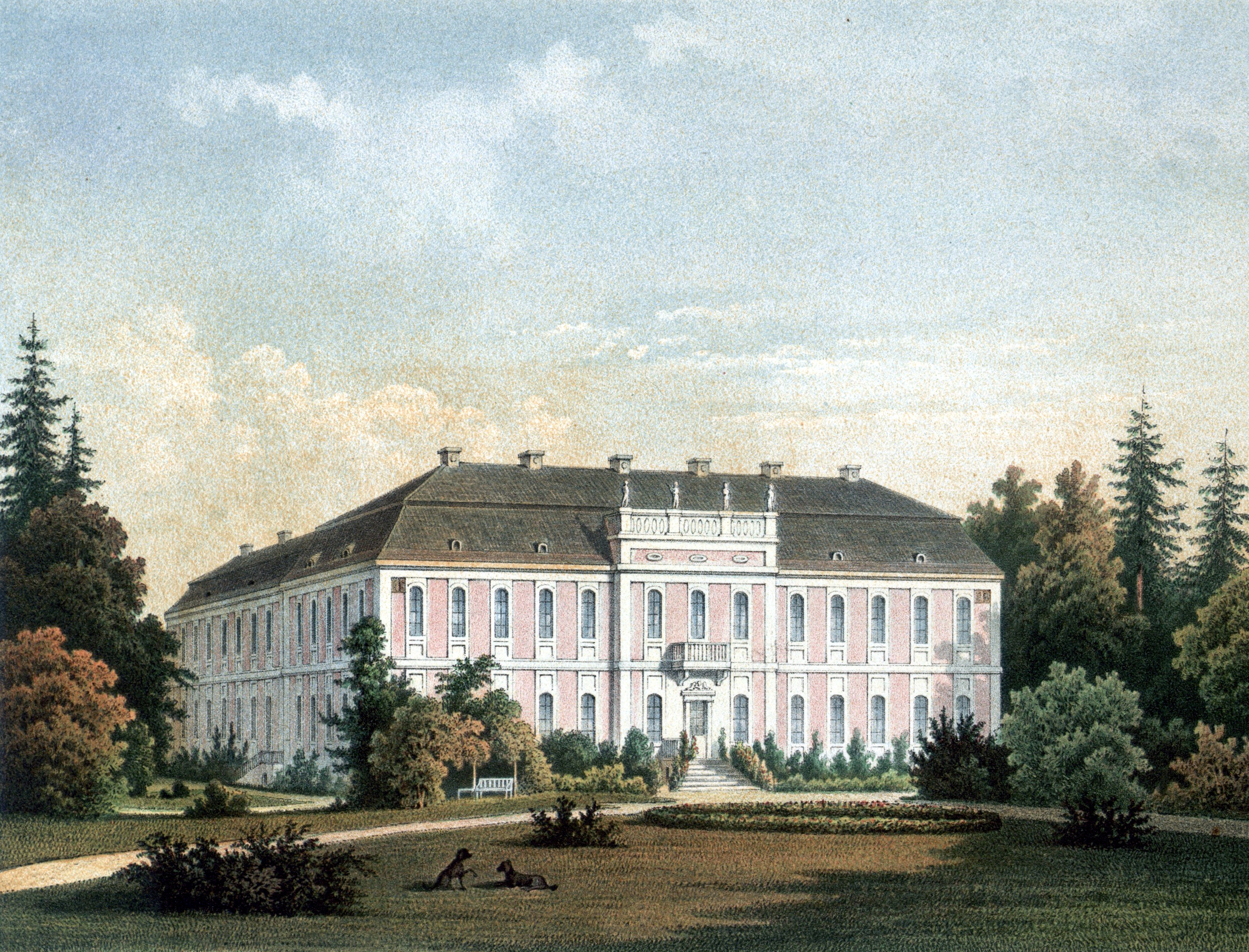
Finckenstein Palace

Collas became the landlord of several estates in East Prussia like Dommelkeim (1703–1753), Naujeninken (1703–1731), Brandwehten (1703–1731), Perkuhnen (1717–1731), Sauerwalde (1720–1731), Laugallen (1718–1731), Kraupischkehmen, (1718–1731), Weißenstein/ Gutenfeld (1721–1753) and owned houses in Wehlau (1721–1753) and Borchersdorf (1724–1753), in total he possessed about 2,720 Hectare.

Collas was a successful architect and projected the baroque palaces of Finckenstein, Friedrichstein, Dönhoffstädt and Jäskendorf.

Collas married Charlotte Pelet (27 February 1700 - 29 December 1751), daughter of the merchant Pierre Pelet, owner of Weißenstein-Gutenfeld manor, and Maria Elisabeth née Salomon on 30 April 1716 in Königsberg.

He died at his manor at Weißenstein.

== See also ==
- Jean de Bodt
