= Drogosze Palace =

Baroque palace in Drogosze, Poland

Drogosze Castle
- Pałac rodu von Dönhoff w Drogoszach
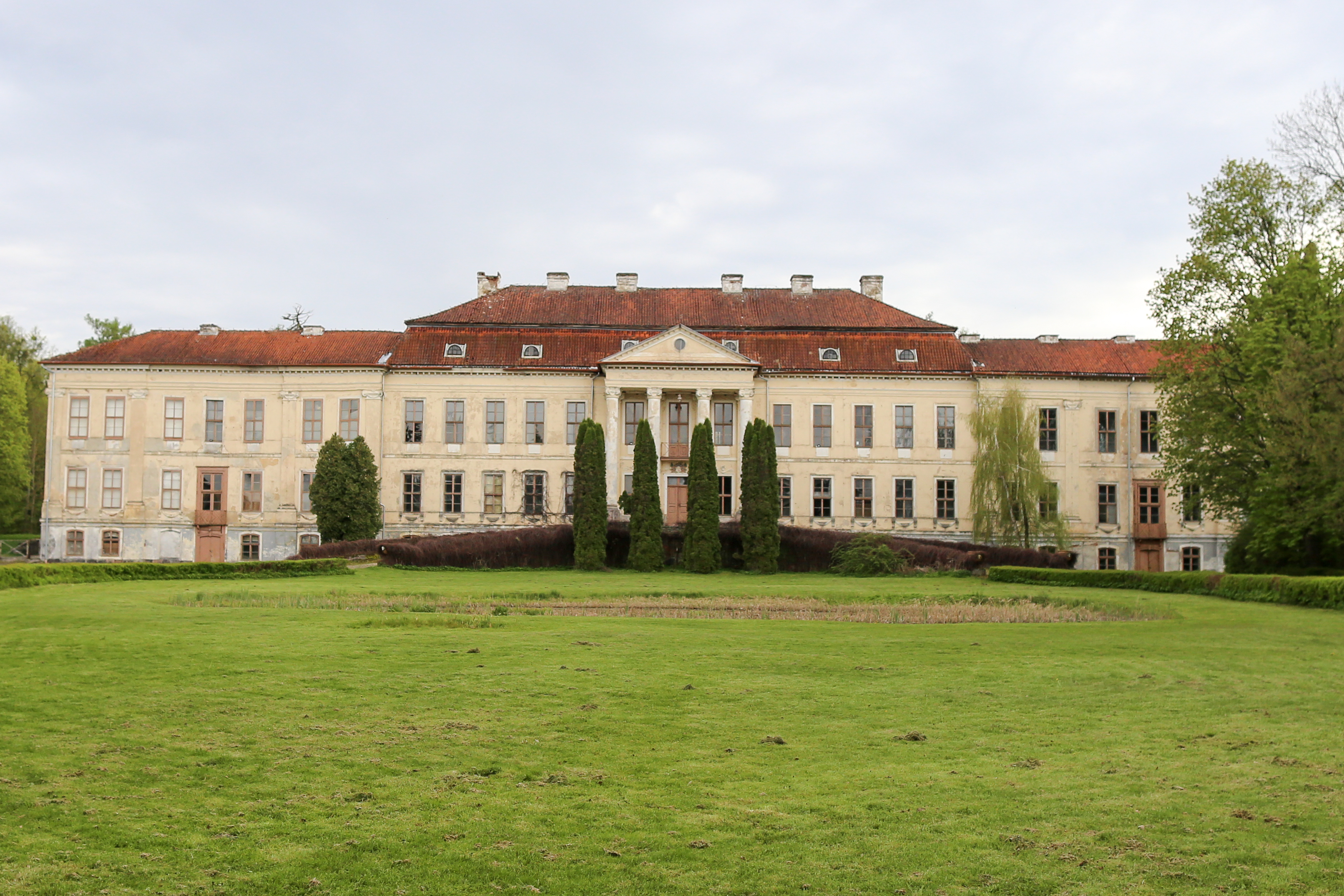

- Location within Poland

General information
- Type: Palace
- Architectural style: Baroque
- Location: Drogosze, Poland
- Coordinates: 54°12′27″N 21°14′00″E
- Construction started: 1710
- Completed: 1714

Drogosze Palace (Polish: Pałac rodu von Dönhoff w Drogoszach or Polish: Pałac w Drogoszach; German: Schloss Dönnhoffstädt) is a baroque palace in Drogosze, in the Warmian-Masurian Voivodeship in Poland, constructed between 1710 and 1714.

It was the seat of the Dönhoff family, members of the Prussian nobility. The palace was one of the so-called 'royal palaces' of the former province of East Prussia, which could be used by the king of Prussia while travelling around. Due to its 100 metres wide façade, it was the largest palace in Masuria and one of the largest in East Prussia as well.

Today, the palace is in poor condition and deteriorating. Also, the landscape park is fully neglected.

== History ==
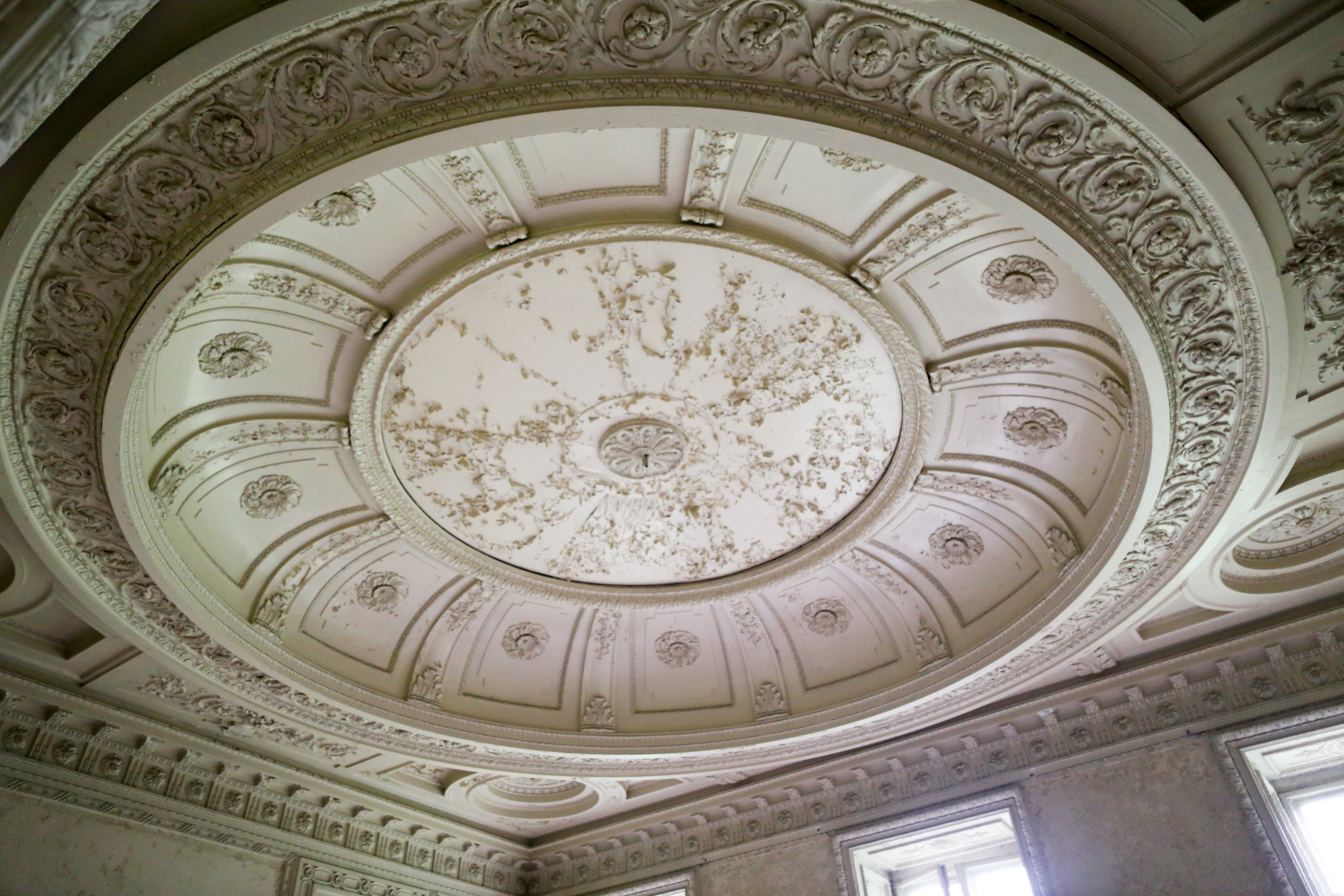
Example of the palace stucco

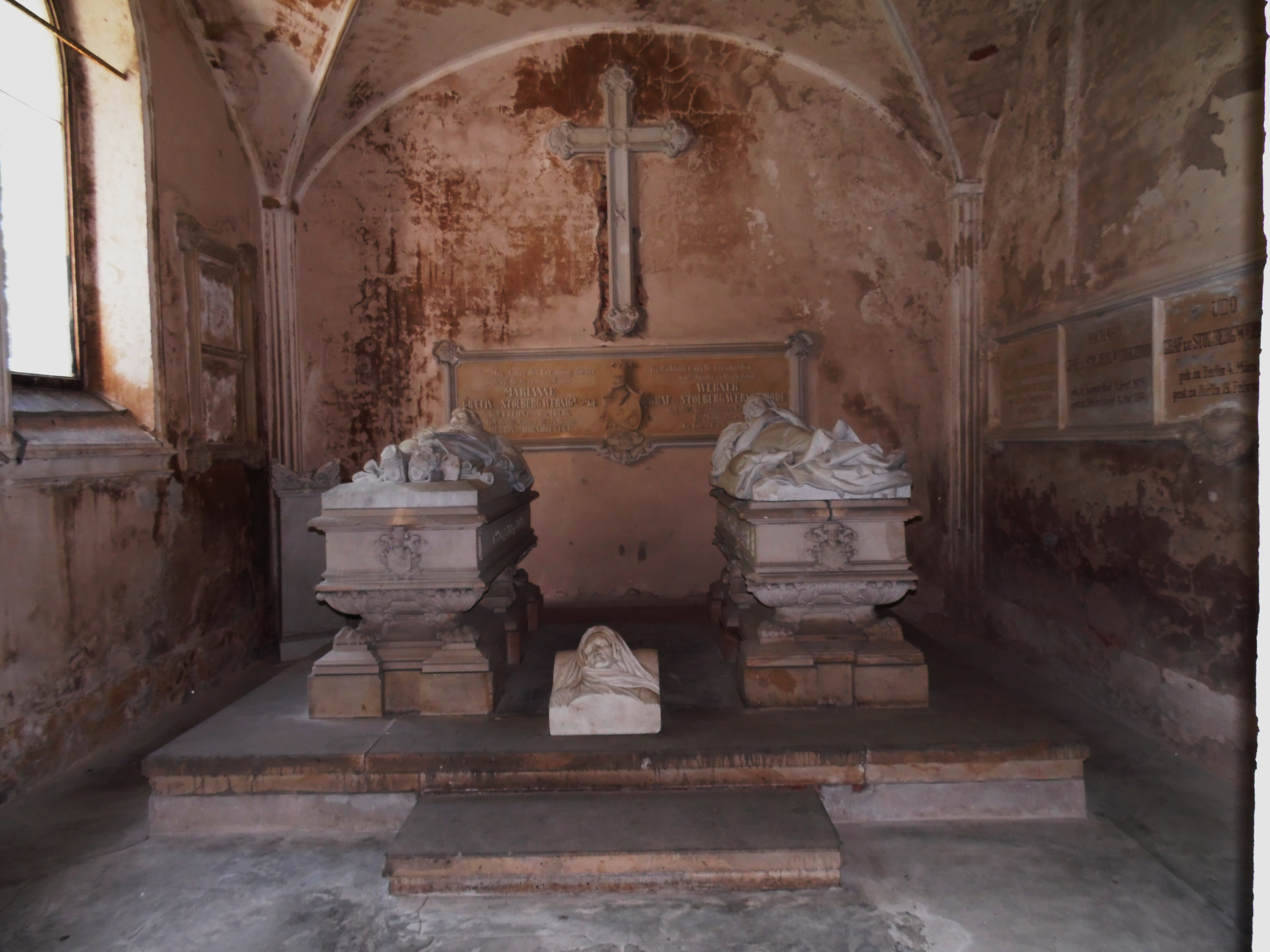
A burial monument in the chapel

=== 17th century and before: Creation of the estate and a renaissance castle ===
Originally, the lands where the village of Drogosze stands today belonged to German colonizers. On land received from the Teutonic Order, a member of a Saxon noble family, Konrad von Wolffersdorff, founded a settlement in 1361, which he named Groß Wolfsdorf.

Subsequently, in 1477, the estates passed into the hands of the Von Rautter family. Ludwig Rautter (1542–1614) built a renaissance castle here between 1596 and 1606. Already at that time, there was a large deer park covering an area of 76 hectares, a gift from the Polish king John II Casimir Vasa (1609–1672).

=== 18th century: A new name and a baroque palace ===
In 1690, the castle was struck by lightning and burned down. The remains were demolished in 1711.

In the same period, the estate passed hands from the Rautter family to the Dönhoff family, a Westphalian family who in the 14th century had moved to Livonia. Count Friedrich von Dönhoff (1639–1696) married the last member from the Rautter family and subsequently acquired the Groß Wolfsdorf estate. Their son, count Boguslaw Friedrich von Dönhoff decided to construct a new palace. He changed the name of the palace and estate to Dönhoffstadt, while leaving the name of the village unchanged.

The new palace was constructed near the site of the old castle. It was built on a raised platform between 1710 and 1716. The design was by the architect John von Collas, who modelled it after Friedrichstein Palace near Königsberg, a design by the architect Jean de Bodt. Friedrichstein was the main residence of the Dönhoff family and was erected by Boguslaw's brother, count Otto Magnus von Dönhoff.

When travelling through Prussia, the kings of Prussia often stayed at the palace, as it was safe and comfortably.

During the 18th century, various additions were made. In 1725, a chapel was constructed in the left wing. In 1766, new outbuildings were added basis plans by Gotthold Wilhelm Maurach. A little later, in place of the previously existing mirror stairs, a wide representative driveway for carriages was built leading to the main entrance, decorated with fountains, flower pots and sculptures.

=== 19th century: Stolberg-Wernigerode ===
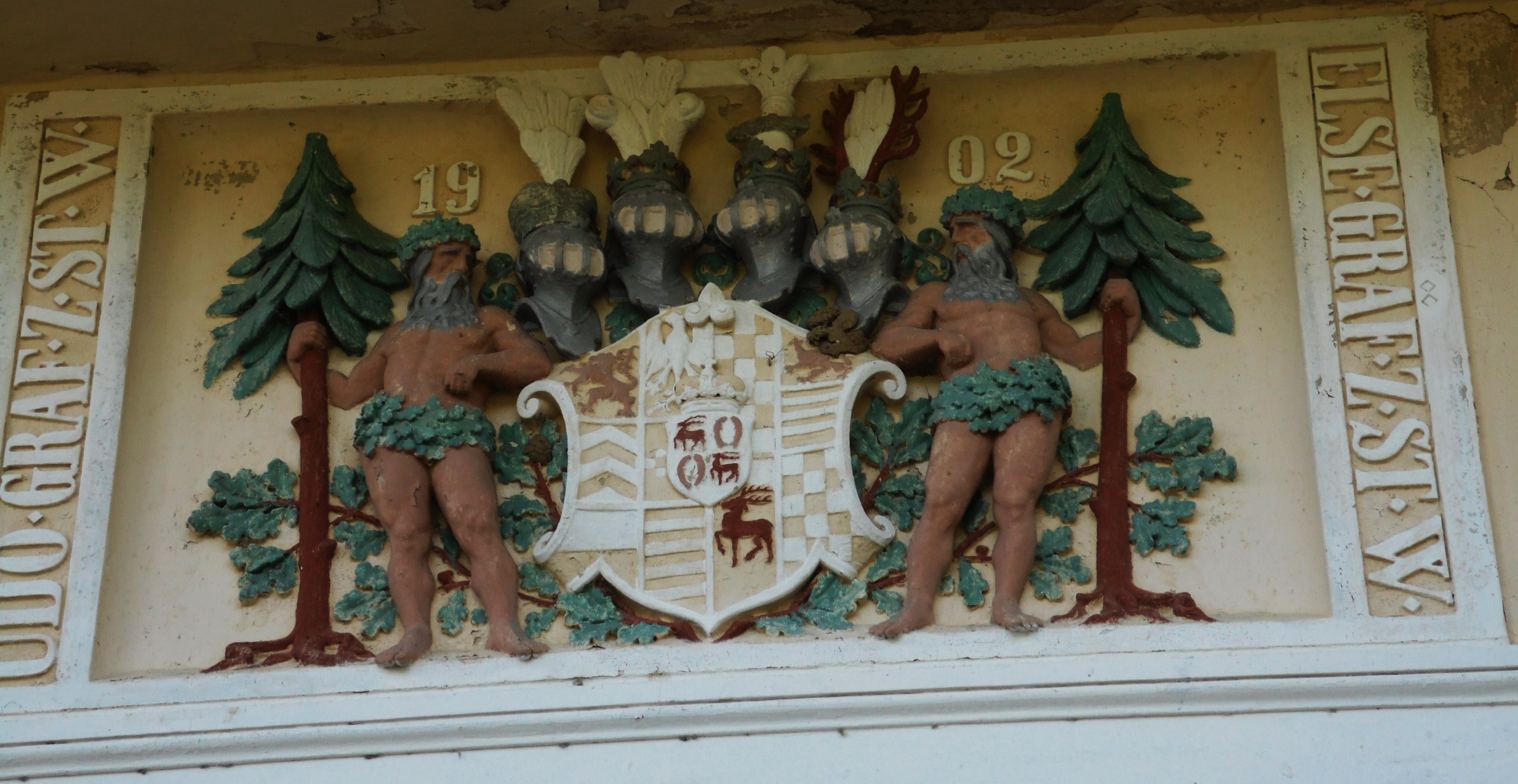
Stolberg-Wernigerode cartouche above the entrance

It remained the property of the Dönhoff counts until 1816 when the last heir, count Stanislaus Otto von Dönhoff, died at the age of 20 years in a duel with the student Friedrich von Saldern in Göttingen. Upon the division of his inheritance, his five sisters divided the extensive family estate. Angélique Dönhoff inherited the estate with Schloss Dönhoffstadt. Later, she married count Georg von Dohna-Lauck, transferring the property to the Dohna noble family.

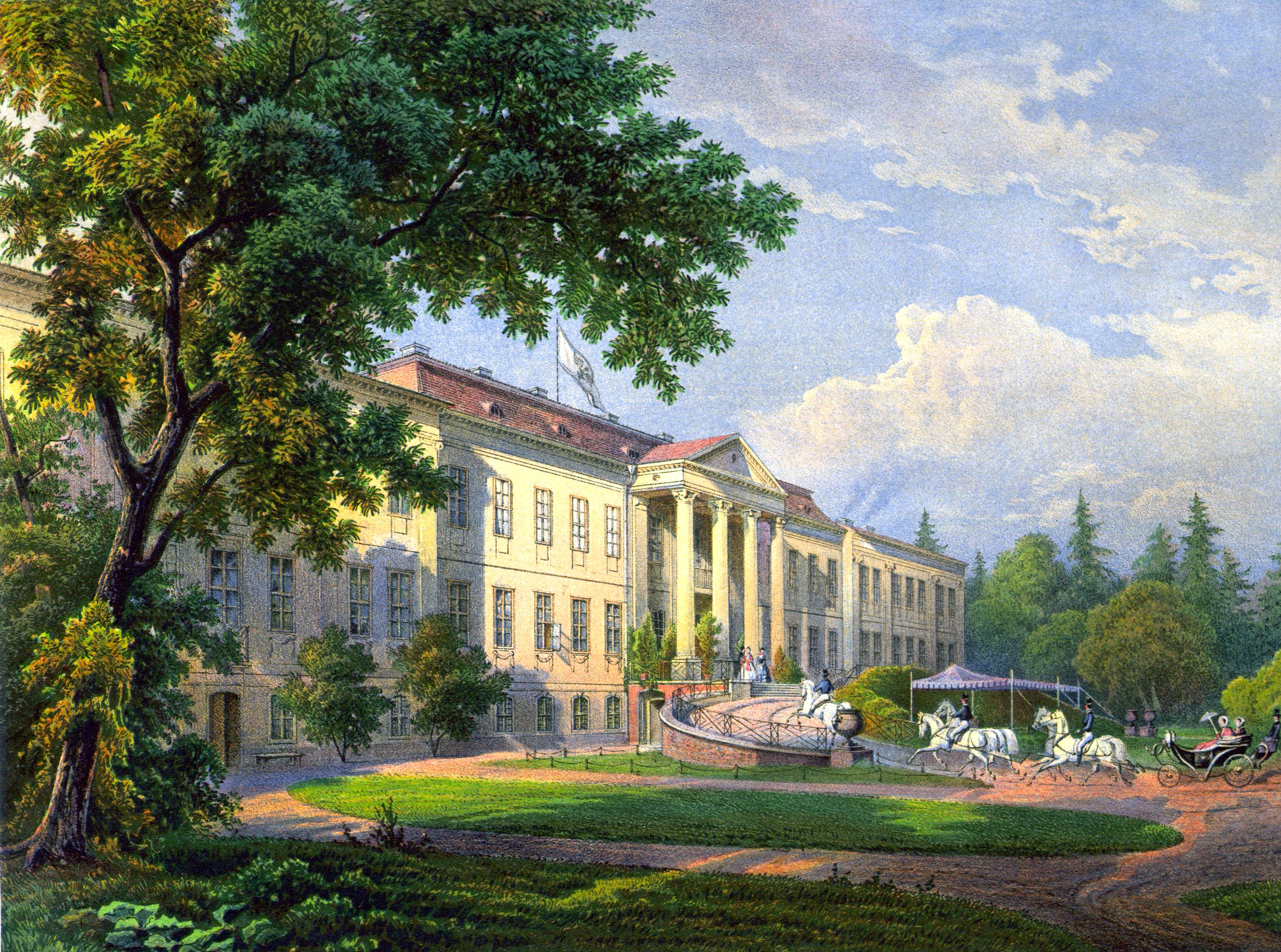
View of the palace by Alexander Duncker around 1860

In 1863, Angélique Dönhoff's niece, countess Marianne zu Stolberg-Wernigerode, inherited the vast Dönhoffstadt estate. Her descendants inhabited it until 1945. Her son was count Udo zu Stolberg-Wernigerode, a prominent president of the German Reichstag and opponent of the Nazis, who also owned an estate in Silesia, named Kreppelhof. Last owner was count Albrecht zu Stolberg-Wernigerode (1886–1948).

At the end of World War II, the Stolberg-Wernigerode family fled from Dönhoffstädt. The palace was plundered and most of its treasures were lost. And subsequently, the estate and palace were confiscated.

=== Modern times: Decline ===
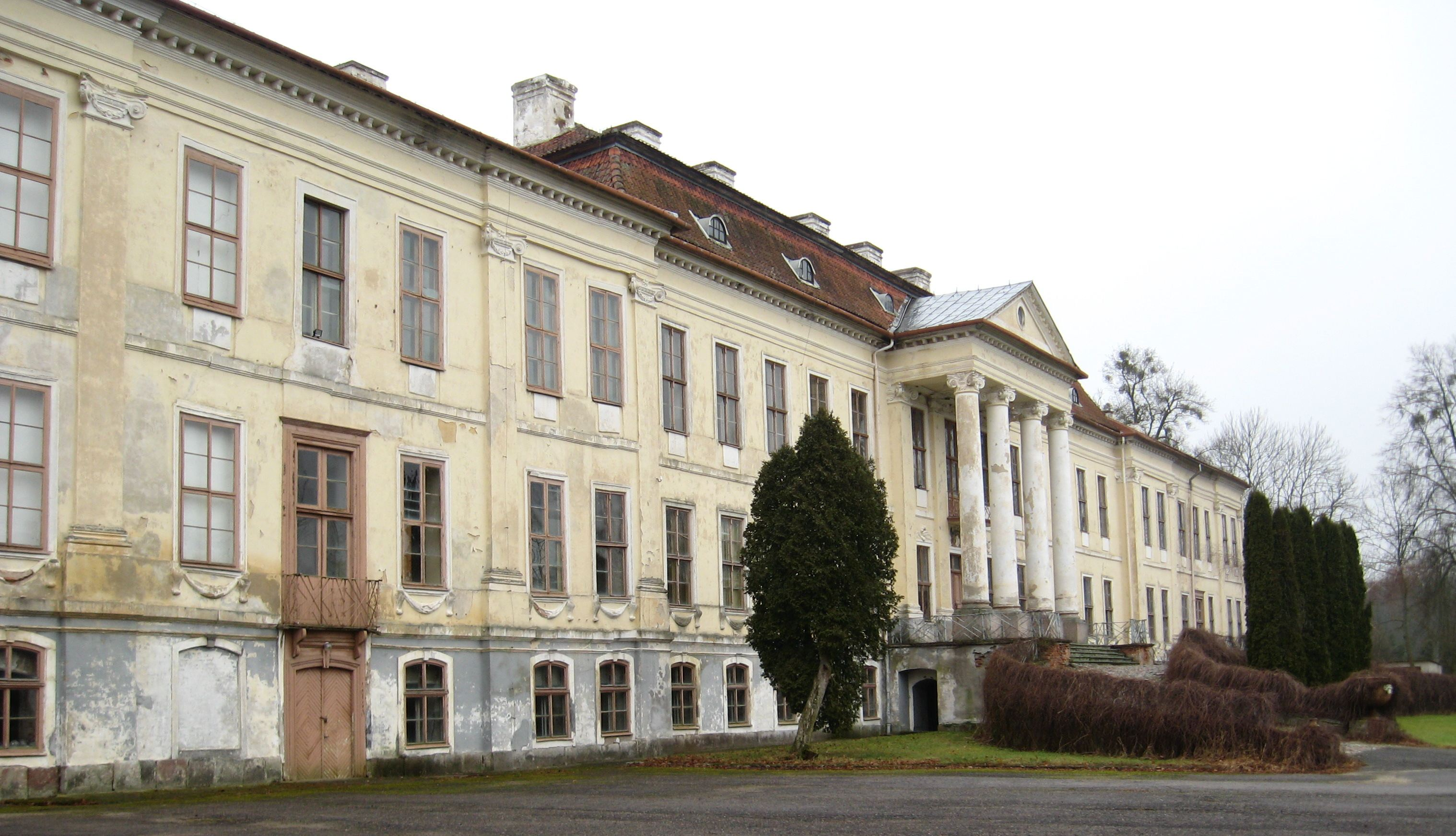
The entrance front in 2008

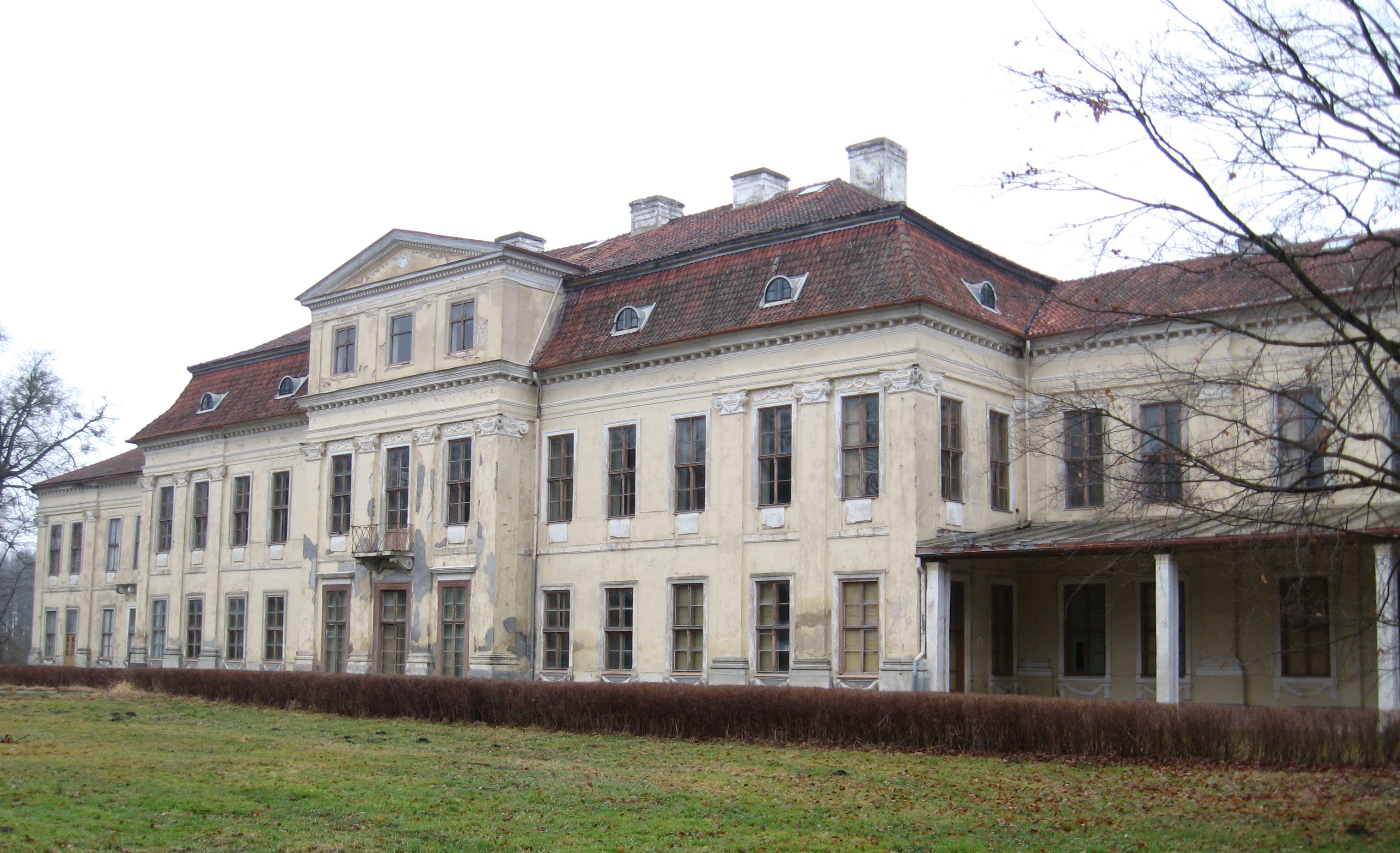
The garden façade in 2008

When the southern part of East Prussia came under Polish administration after World War II, the palace was used as an agricultural school from 1954 to 1991. A restoration took place in 1975. Much of the beautiful stucco and monumental fireplaces have been preserved. Unfortunately, a large part of the interior has been lost due to looting and vandalism. Beautiful ceiling paintings still exist in two rooms on the first floor overlooking the park.

Since 1993, the castle has been privately owned and vacant. It is threatened by decay because the owner has not carried out any maintenance. Plans to convert the castle into a hotel have not been realized so far.

Remnants of the archive are now located in the archives in Olsztyn. The Dönhoffstädt library, two trucks filled with books, including two Egyptian papyrus scrolls and a guest book with notes from Napoleon Bonaparte and Emperor Wilhelm II, were given to the university of Toruń after World War II. What remained of the furniture and paintings is now located in the palace of Morąg and the Olsztyn museum.

== Architecture: The Versailles of East Prussia ==
In 1701, Prussia was elevated from ducal status to royal status, and its new king, Frederick I of Prussia (1657–1713), wished to see his kingdom to be provided with some magnificent baroque palaces for reasons of cultural representation. Hence, the East Prussian nobility constructed a range of so-called ‘royal palaces’. The counts von Dönhoff created Friedrichstein and Dönhoffstadt. The counts Dohna built Schlobitten and Schlodien. The counts Finck von Finckenstein erected Finckenstein Palace, and the counts Waldburg constructed Capustigall.

John von Collas modelled Dönhoffstadt after schloss Friedrichstein near Königsberg. The main block was similar, but the wings were extended creating a façade of 100 metres wide. It became one of the largest palaces in East Prussia. The castle was also known as the Versailles of East Prussia.

The palace had four columns representing the four seasons, 12 chimneys representing the 12 months, 52 rooms representing the 52 weeks in a year, 365 windows representing the 365 days in a year, and 7 balconies representing the 7 days of the week.

The palace had its own theatre in the western wing. The eastern wing housed an extensive library and a chapel. Around 1830, the chapel was first transformed into Neo-Gothic style, and a few years later (around 1850), the entire palace was renovated.

Above the entrance there is a colorful and richly decorated cartouche of the coat of arms of the Stolberg-Wernigerode family with the date 1902. The roof of the main building is of a mansard structure, while the side wings added in 1766 are covered with a gable roof.

== Park ==
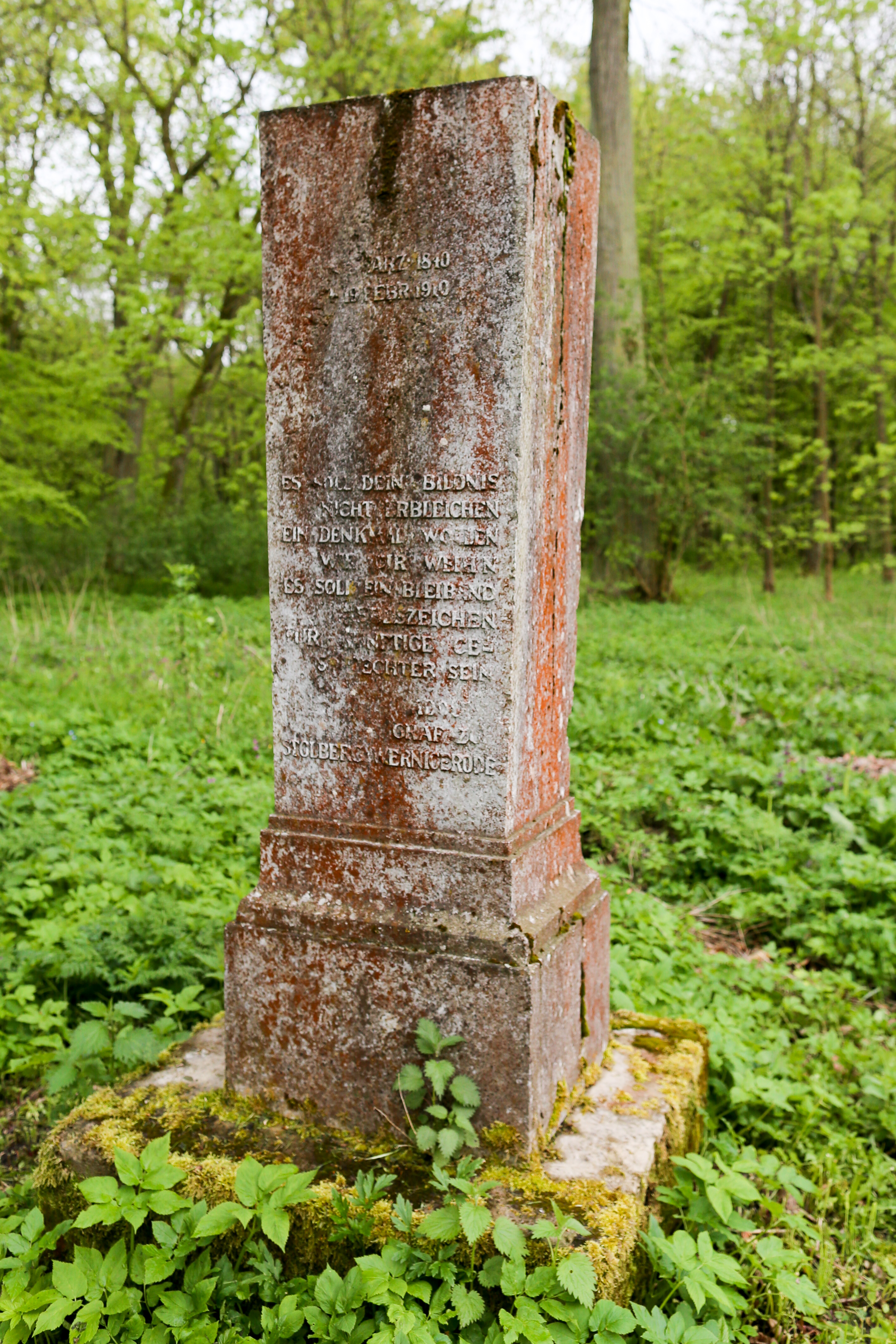
A Stolberg-Wernigerode monument in the garden

The site is surrounded by a landscape park, which has now lost its original composition and gently transitions into the forest. There are several ponds with artificial islands in its area, and in a slightly further area, in the forest, deer breeding was carried out from 1690, which was later created as a reserve. In the park in the immediate vicinity of the palace, from the garden side, there is a large plaque commemorating the faithful servants of the estate and a monument to the Stolberg-Wernigrode family

Remnants of the baroque garden, in the form of sandstone sculptures and vases, were preserved in the vicinity of the palace until 1945.

== Literature ==
- Sieber, Helmut (1958). Schlösser und Herrensitz in Ost- und Westpreussen – Nach alten Stichen und Zeichnungen (in German). Frankfurt am Main: Wolfgang Weidlich. pp. 70–72.
- von Lorck, Carl (1965). Landschlösser und Gutshäuser in Ost- und Westpreußen (in German). Frankfurt am Main: Weidlich. pp. 205–208.
- Gräfin Eulenburg, Adelheid; Engels, Hans (1992). Ostpreußische Gutshäuser in Polen: Gegenwart und Erinnerung (in German). C.H. Beck Verlag. p. 136. ISBN 978-3406367984.
- Heckmann, Hermann (1998). Baumeister des Barock und Rokoko in Brandenburg-Preussen (in German). Berlin: Verlag für Bauwesen. p. 506. ISBN 3-345-00631-6.
- Garniec, Mirosław; Jackiewicz-Garniec, Małgorzata (2001). Schlösser und Gutshäuser im ehemaligen Ostpreussen (in German). Arta. p. 400. ISBN 978-8391284032.
- Köster, Sabine; Podmostko-Klos, Aleksandra (2010). "Schloss Dönhoffstädt. Architektur als diplomatischer Ausdruck eines gesellschaftlichen Spannungsfeldes". In Woldt, Isabella; Zuchowski, Tadeusz J. (eds.). Im Schatten von Berlin und Warschau Adelssitze im Herzogtum Preußen und Nordpolen 1650-1850 (in German). Berlin: Dietrich Reimer Verlag. pp. 127–154. ISBN 978-3496014102.
