= Friedrichstein Palace =

Friedrichstein is a former baroque palace in East Prussia, near Königsberg

Coordinates: 54.644852°N 20.733327°E

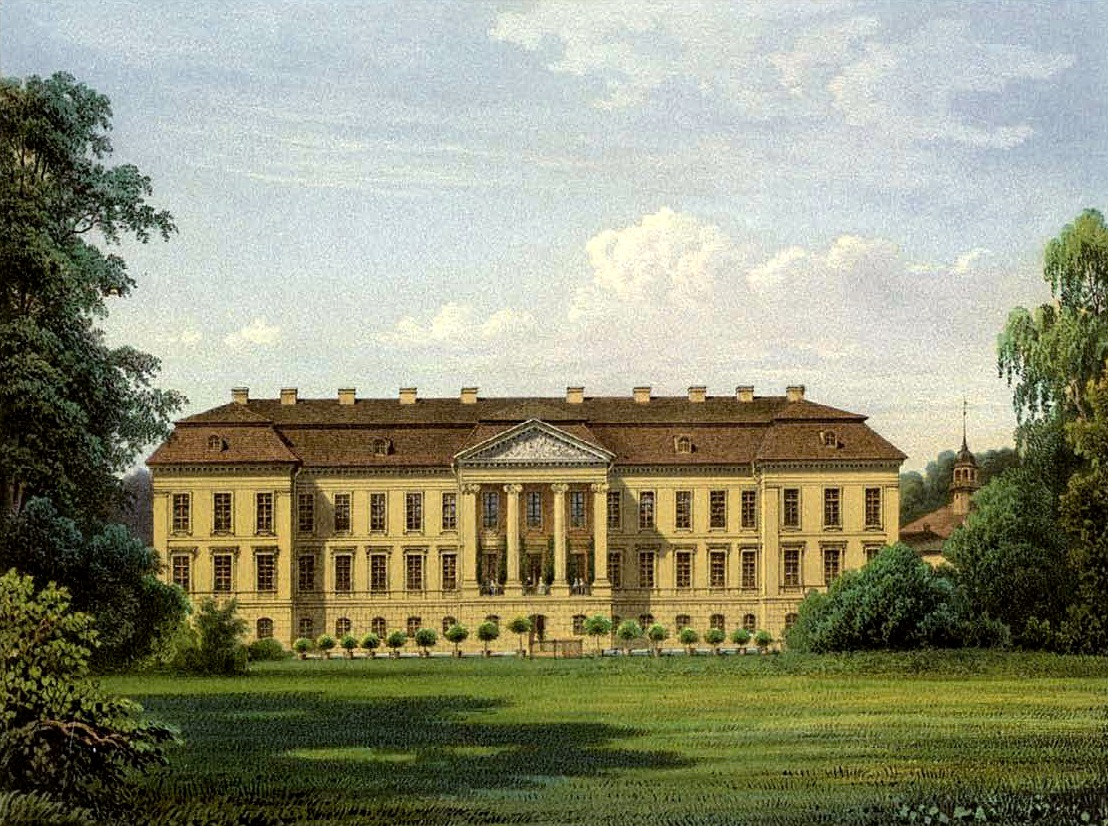
Garden front of Friedrichstein Palace by Alexander Duncker around 1860

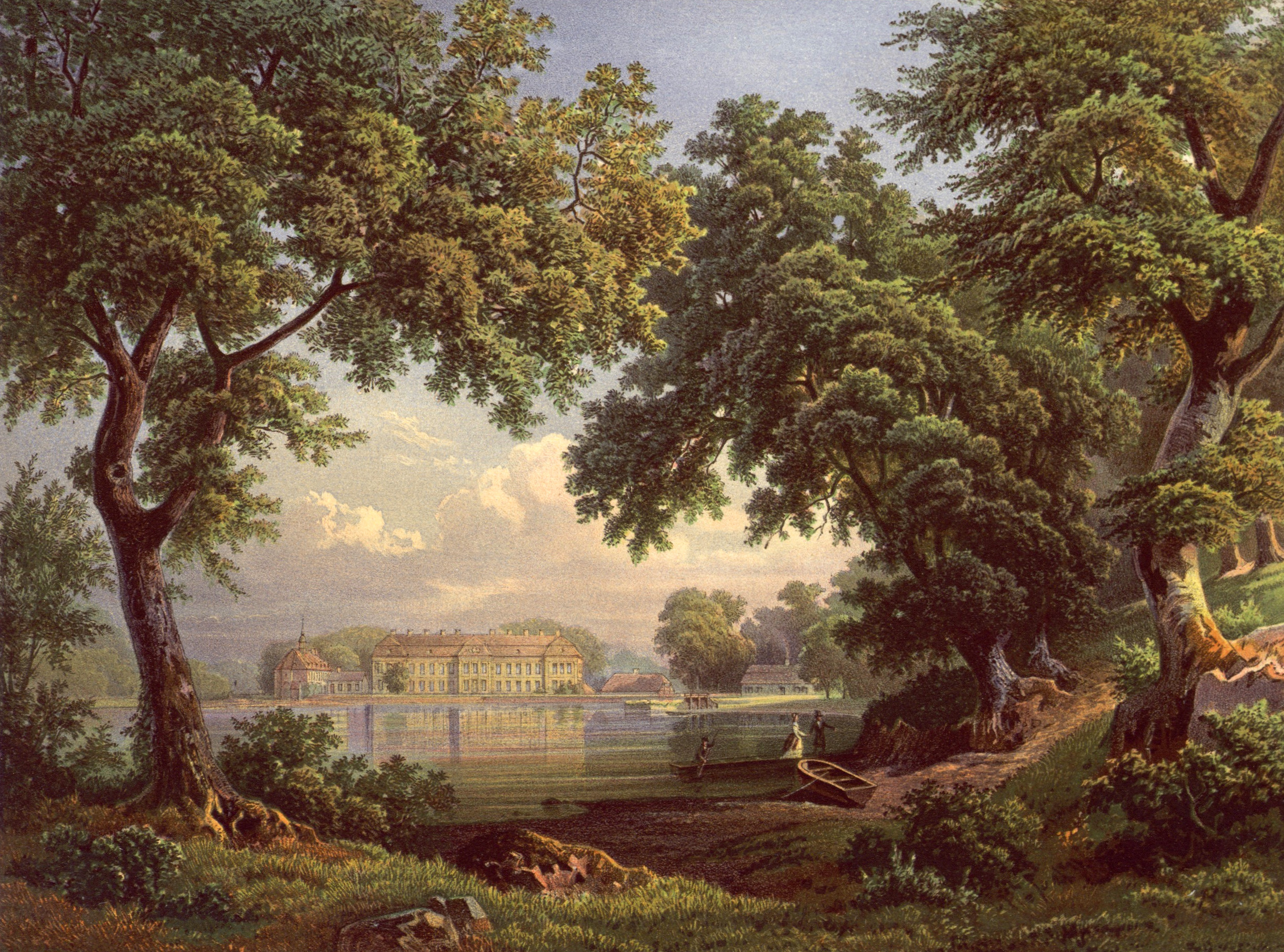
Friedrichstein Palace by Alexander Duncker around 1860

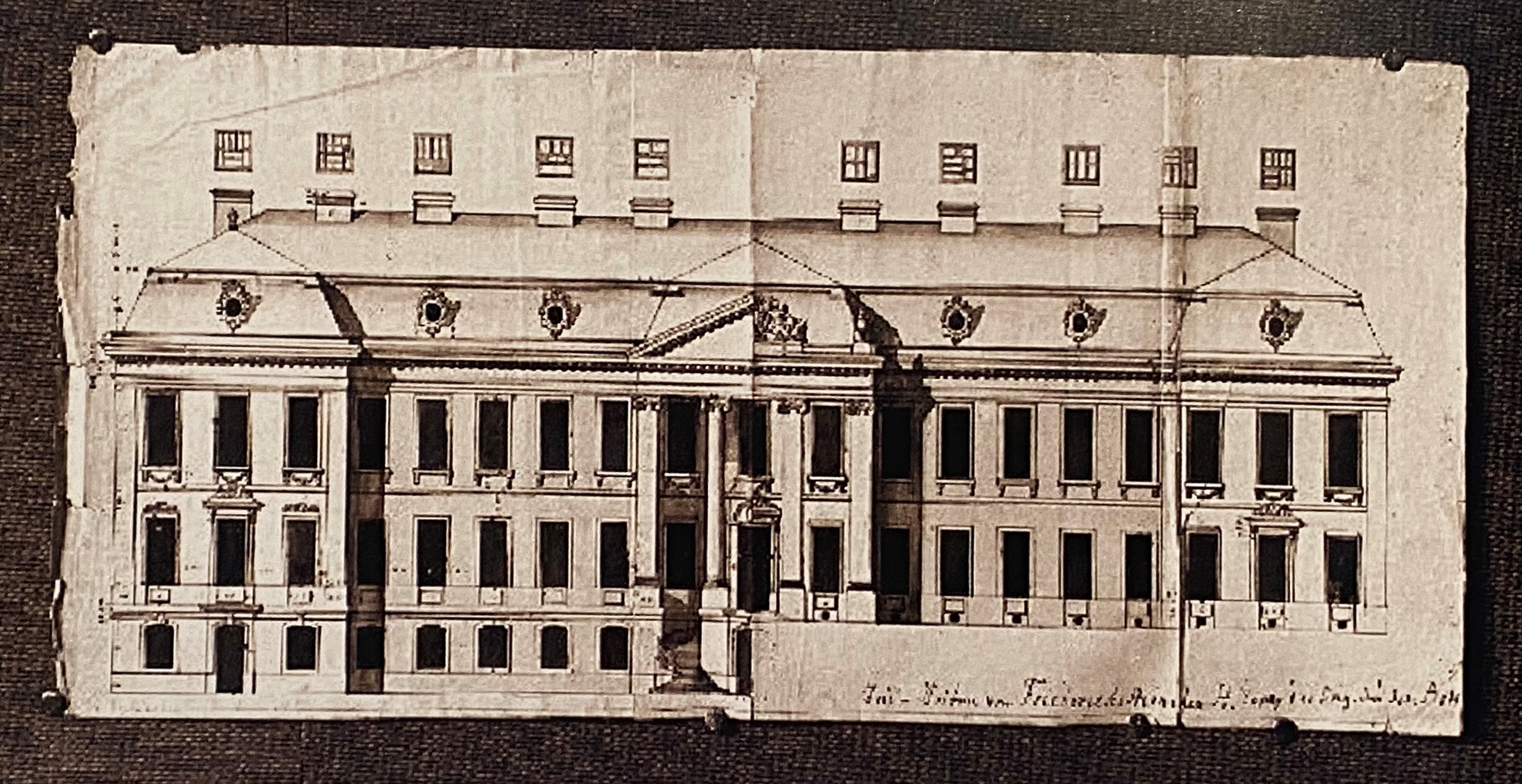
Design by Jean de Bodt

Friedrichstein Palace (German: Schloss Friedrichstein) was a baroque palace near Königsberg, East Prussia. It was designed by Jean de Bodt, and constructed between 1709 and 1714. The palace was the main residence of the Dönhoff family.

The palace was one of the so-called 'royal palaces' of East Prussia, which could be used by the king of Prussia while travelling. In January 1945, the Red Army looted and destroyed the palace. It was considered one of the most beautiful stately homes in Prussia.

The German journalist and publisher Marion Dönhoff was born at the palace and grew up there. However, today nothing remains of the main building. The park still exists, as do various ancillary buildings.

== Location ==
The palace was located in Löwenhagen, twenty kilometres east of Königsberg, nowadays Kaliningrad, in the valley of the Pregolya river. After the Second World War, the village of Löwenhagen was renamed to Kamenka. It is part of the Guryevsky District in the Kaliningrad Oblast, Russia.

== History ==
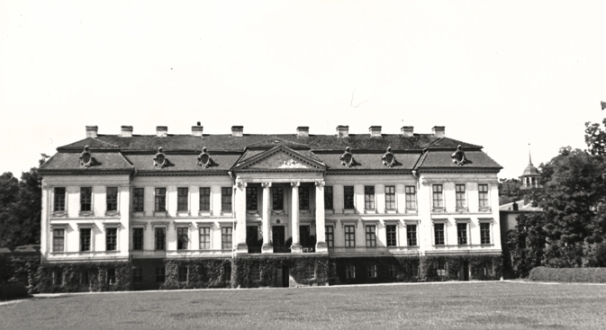
Garden front of Friedrichstein palace

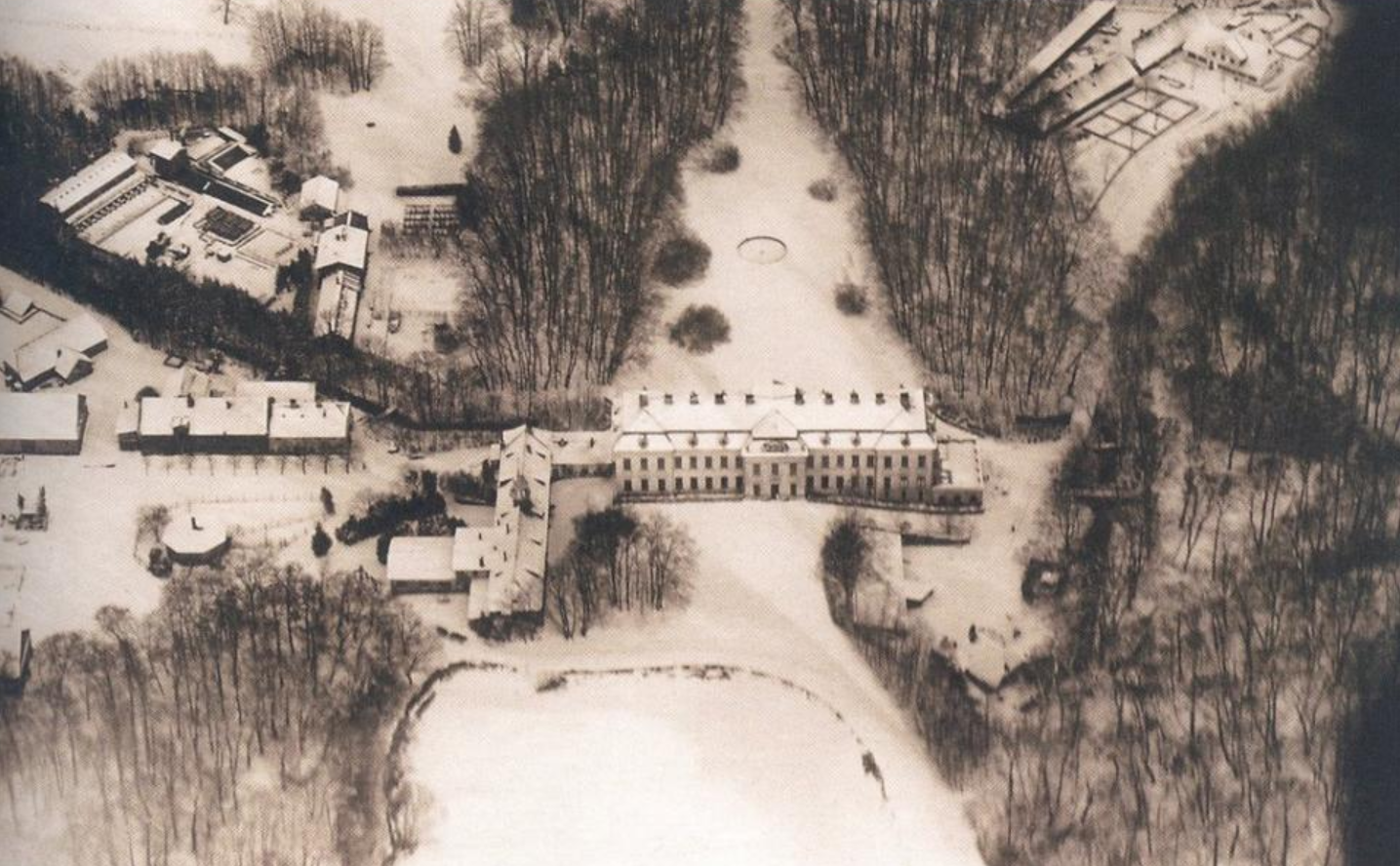
Aerial view of Friedrichstein palace

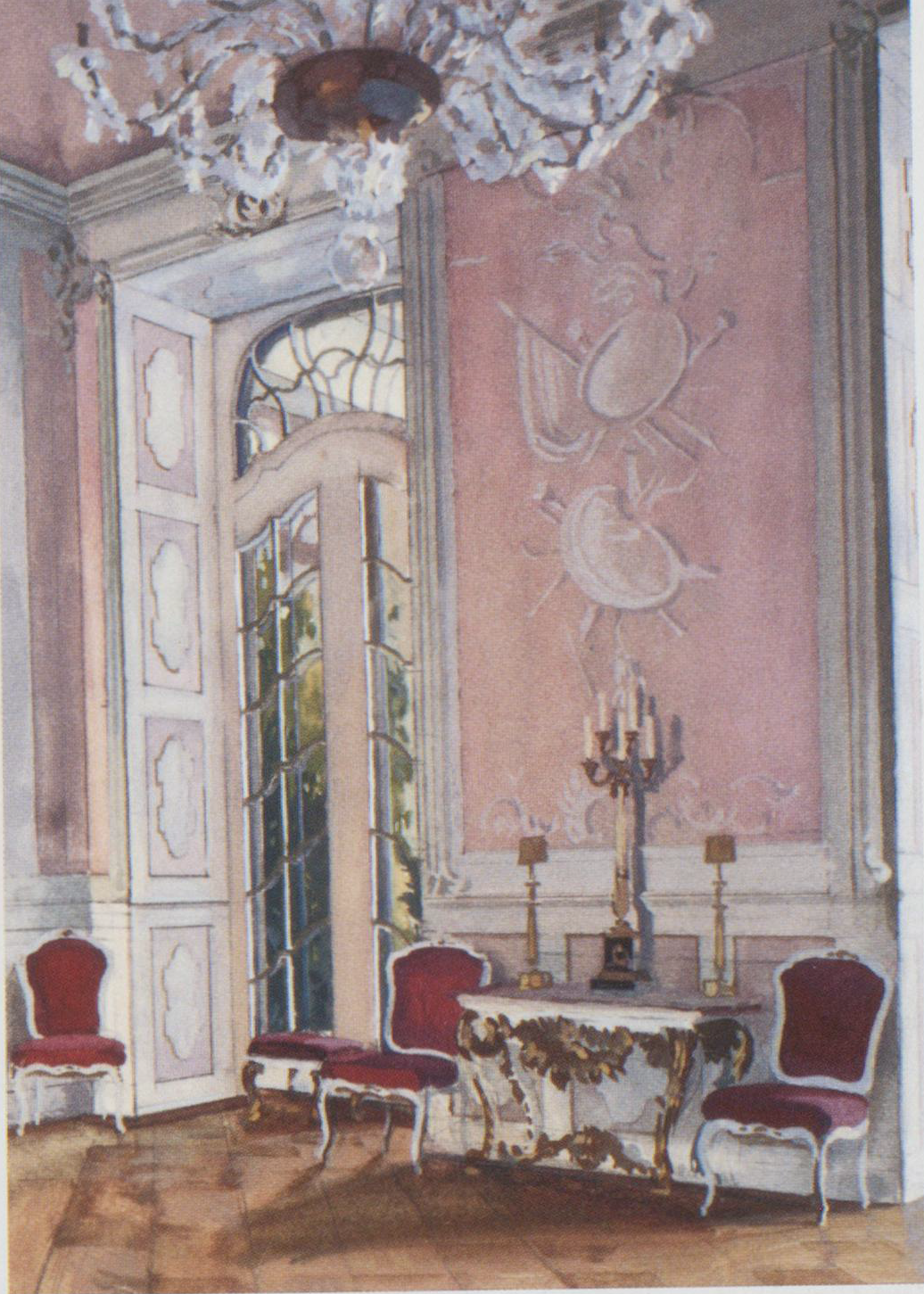
Aquarell of the garden room

=== 17th century ===
The lands where the on which the palace was built were bought by count Bar in the 16th century. He constructed a residential house, a barn and a granary. However, due to financial difficulties, he transferred the estate to Friedrich von Waldburg in the 17th century. It was he who built the first manor house and gave his name to the estate: ‘Friedrichstein’.

Upon Friedrich von Waldburg's death in 1625, the estate passed to his widow, Maria von Waldburg. She died in 1642, leaving the inheritance to Hans Albrecht von Waldburg, who was forced to sell the property due to poor economic conditions. At this time, the estate was around 450 hectares.

On 2 September 1666, Frederick William, Elector of Brandenburg and Duke of Prussia, approved the acquisition of the estate by Count Friedrich von Dönhoff (1639–1696). Friedrich was a chamberlain of the elector and lieutenant colonel. The Dönhoff family owned the estate for eight generations from 1666 to 1945, when it was confiscated by the Soviet Union. Friedrich was succeeded by his eldest son, Otto Magnus von Dönhoff (1665–1717), who would become a lieutenant general and diplomat for the Prussian king, Frederick I of Prussia (1657–1713). The king would honour him by making him one of the first recipients of the Order of the Black Eagle.

=== 18th century ===
In the winter of 1709, a fire destroyed the manor house. There was talk of the guilt of "fiery spirits" believed in by the inhabitants of East Prussia, but it is assumed that the cause was set on fire by neighbours who felt hostility towards the ‘haughty aristocracy’.

Otto Magnus von Dönhoff decided to construct a new palace in baroque style. The designs were done by the architect Jean de Bodt and the building works supervised by John von Collas. The construction occurred between 1709 and 1714. Otto Magnus employed 100 soldiers of the regiment he commanded to help.

In 1701, Otto Magnus married Wilhelmina Amalia, the daughter of count Alexander zu Dohna-Schlobitten. Together, they had five sons and five daughters. The heir was the eldest son, Friedrich II von Dönhoff (1717–1769), who was married to Wilhelmine Sophie von Kameke (1712–1758). Subsequently, the palace passed to their son, the Prussian Minister of War Christian von Dönhoff (1742–1803), married to Charlotte Amalie Rollaz du Rosey (1742–1813); and then to their son, Count August von Dönhoff (1763–1838).

== 19th century ==
In the middle of the 19th century, August Heinrich Hermann von Dönhoff (1797–1874), a diplomat and foreign minister of Prussia, lived at Friedrichstein. He was succeeded by his son, August von Dönhoff (1845–1920), a diplomat and member of the Prussian House of Lords and German Reichstag. In 1896, he married the 24 years younger Maria von Lepel (1869–1940), lady in waiting to the Queen of Prussia and German Empress, Augusta Victoria (1858–1921), wife of Wilhelm II (1859–1941). Together, they had eight children. The youngest of them was the journalist and writer Marion Dönhoff (1909–2002), who was born at Friedrichstein and grew up there.

August von Dönhoff had a passion for collecting. Within the palace, he amassed an impressive array of valuable musical instruments, ornamental weaponry, exquisite carpets, and more.

=== 20th century ===
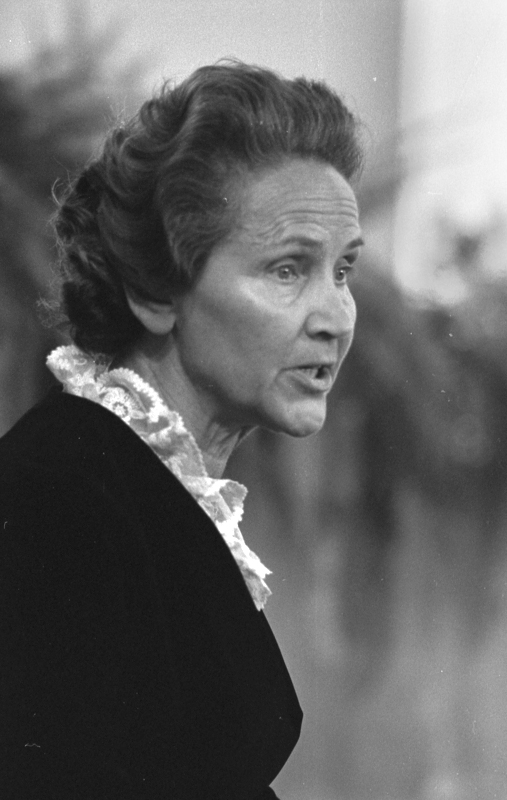
Countess Marion von Dönhoff

In 1920, count Heinrich von Dönhoff (1899–1942) inherited Friedrichstein Palace. Initially, his mother managed the estate on his behalf, with the advice of the former Saxon minister von Falkenhausen. Around 1922, Count Heinrich took over the administration himself. He modernized the estate management according the latest standards, the palace was renovated in the 1930s, and the park was restored to its former Baroque structure.

In Heinrich's time, the estate was one the largest private land holdings in Germany. The Friedrichstein estate, including the palace, pheasantry, and Amalienhof, the forest (protected forest), Groß Hohenhagen, and Wehnenfeld with the outlying Lottienenhof farm, covered 6,215 hectares. The Quittainen estate included another 9,907 hectares, totalling more than 160 square kilometres.

=== World War II and thereafter ===
August Karl and Maria von Dönhoff had eight children, who took different positions towards Nazism, the problems of World War II and its consequences, i.e. the decisions of the Potsdam Conference of the Big Three. The daughter, Marion Dönhoff (1909–2002), joined the resistance movement and was questioned by the Gestapo after a failed assassination attempt on Hitler in 1944. Although many of her fellow resistance activists were executed, she was released, reportedly because her name was not found in any of the documents seized by the Nazis.

In January 1945, as Soviet troops rolled into the region, Dönhoff fled East Prussia, travelling seven weeks on horseback before reaching Hamburg. She recounted her journey in a 1962 book of essays called Names No One Mentions Anymore.

In 1946, Marion Dönhoff joined the fledgling, Hamburg-based intellectual weekly Die Zeit as political editor, ultimately becoming its publisher in 1972. She also became a social activist fighting for the reconciliation of Germany with the countries of Eastern Europe. She was elected a Foreign Honorary Member of the American Academy of Arts and Sciences in 1990.

Soviet soldiers set the palace on fire. They made special efforts to destroy "fascist Venus and stags" (statues and bas-reliefs were blown up with dynamite). It is probable that at that time the valuable monument of Immanuel Kant by Christian Daniel Rauch was also destroyed. In 1944, Marion had it transported (with the consent of the Königsberg authorities) to Friedrichstein to protect it from the expected Allied bombings on the city.

The walls of the burned palace were slightly damaged, but no reconstruction was started and there was no objection to the devastation of the interior. It was supported by the information that it was a "fascist lair" and "Göring's Dacha". The ruins were gradually dismantled. When in 1989, Marion Dönhoff visited the constantly remembered and loved place of her birth, she found only traces of foundations (some farm buildings have been preserved).

The last owners of Friedrichstein were Marion's brothers, count Heinrich von Dönhoff (1920–1942) and count Dietrich von Dönhoff (1902–1991) – the eighth generation of the Dönhoff family at Friedrichstein. The son of count Heinrich, count Hermann von Dönhoff was adopted by his uncle, the last prince of Hatzfeld-Wildenburg, Franz-Hermann, becoming one of the largest landowners in Rhineland-Palatinate and Brandenburg. He lives in Crottorf castle in Friesenhagen, from where he manages the Hatzfeld estates and Schönstein castle as well. Marion Dönhoff died in Crottorf in 2002.

==== Gallery: A tour of the palace interior around 1910 ====
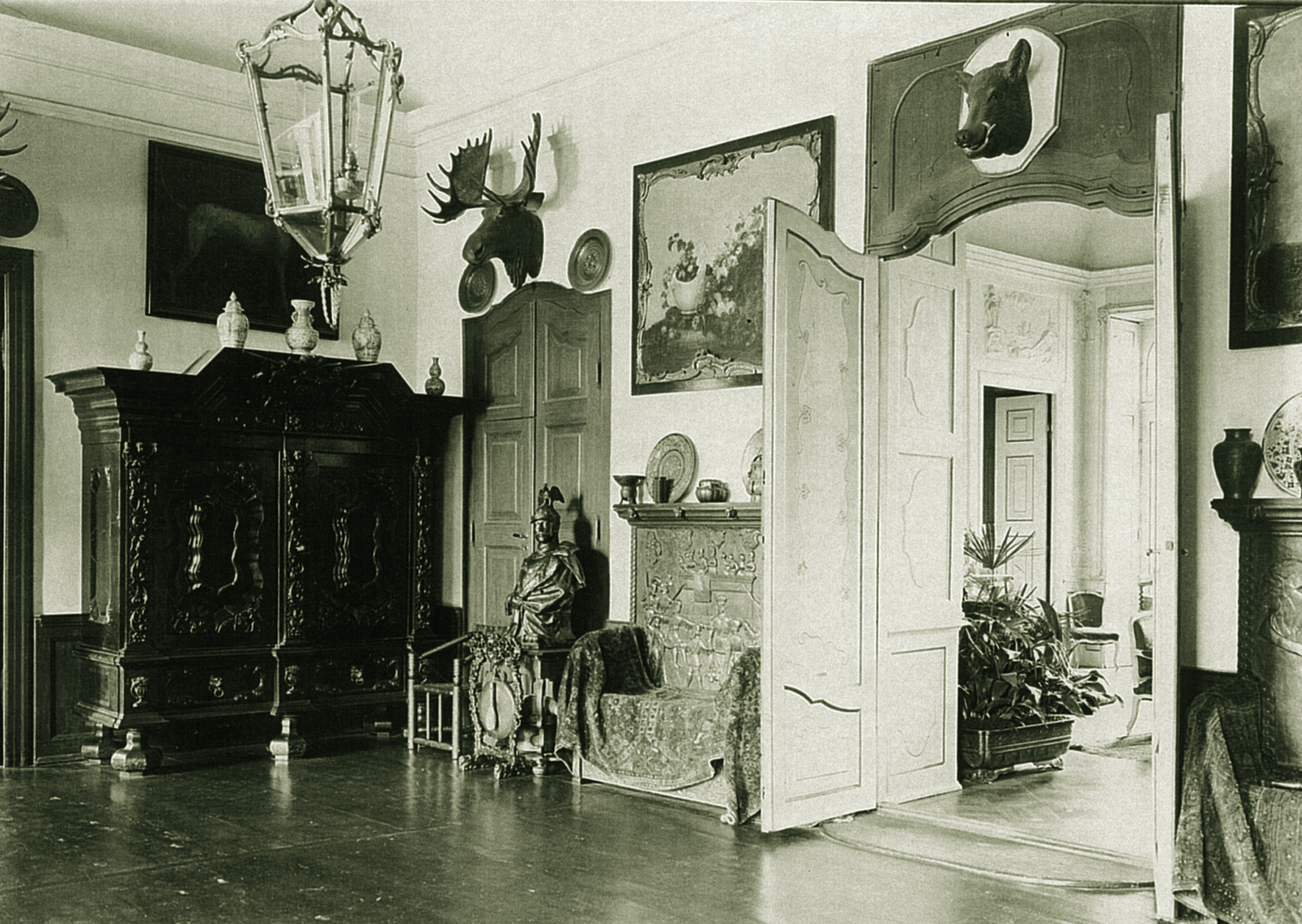
Vestibule

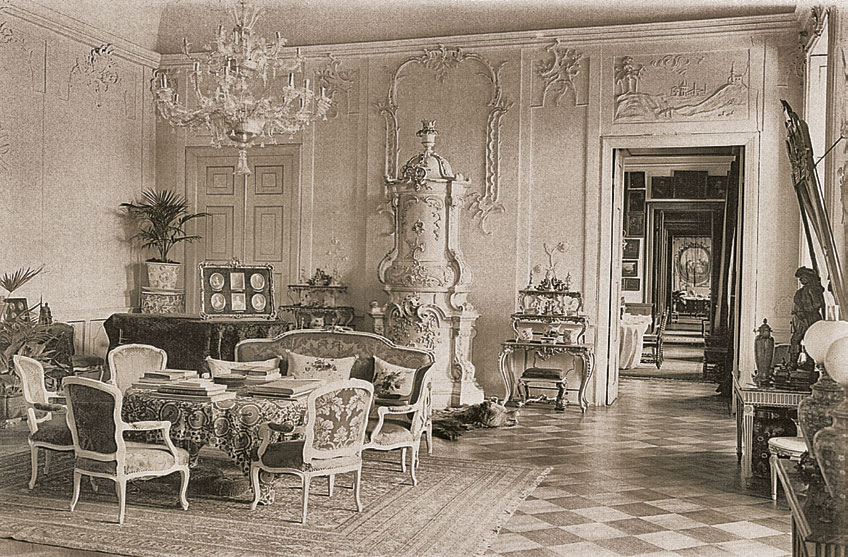
Garden room looking north

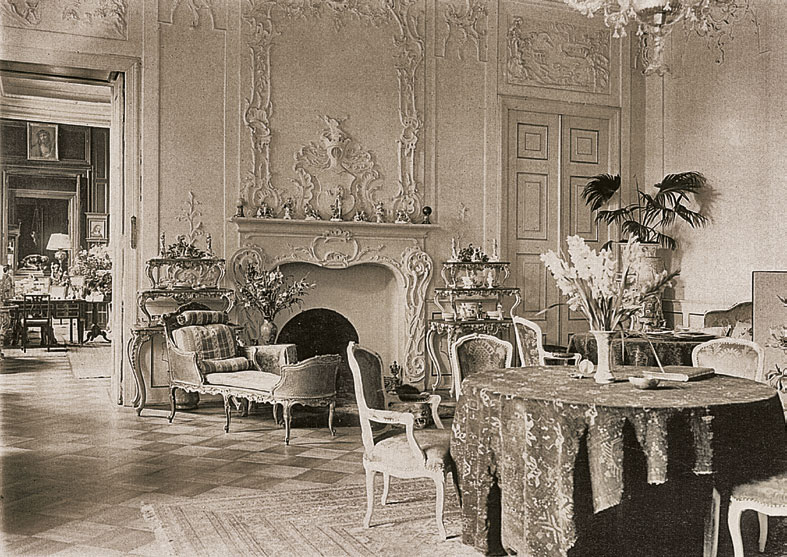
Garden room looking south

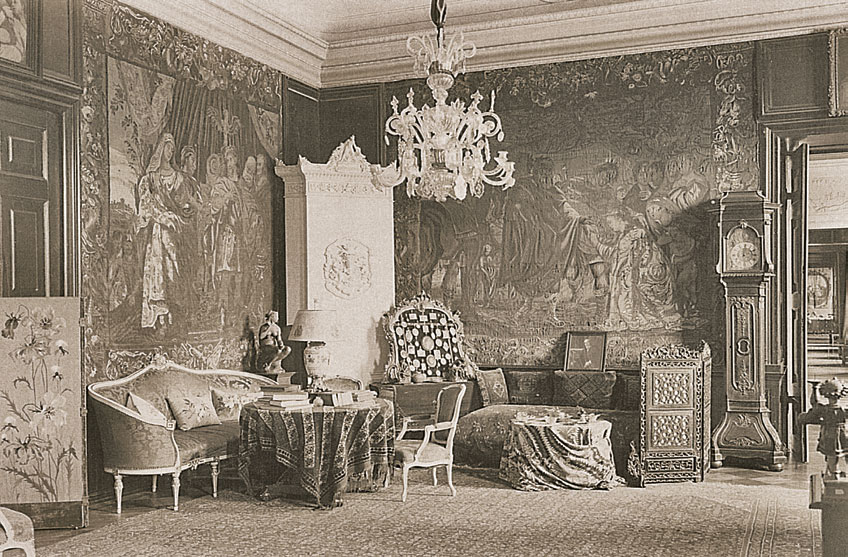
Green salon looking north

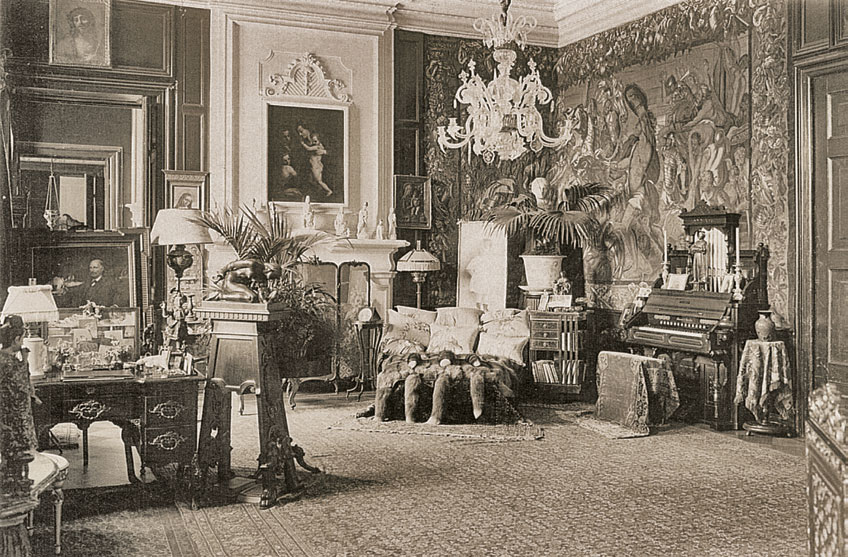
Green salon looking south

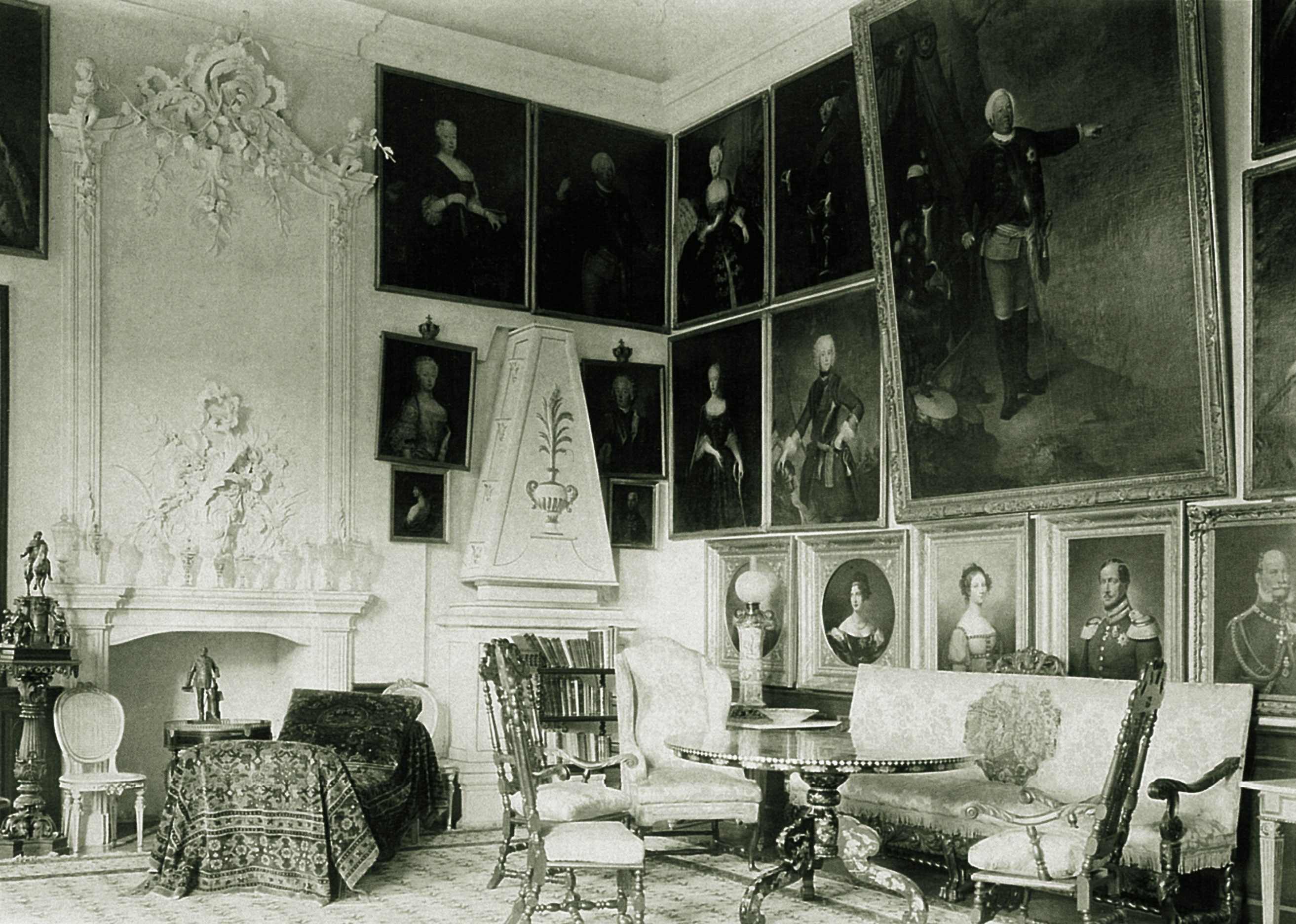
The Hohenzollernstube contained paintings of the Prussian kings

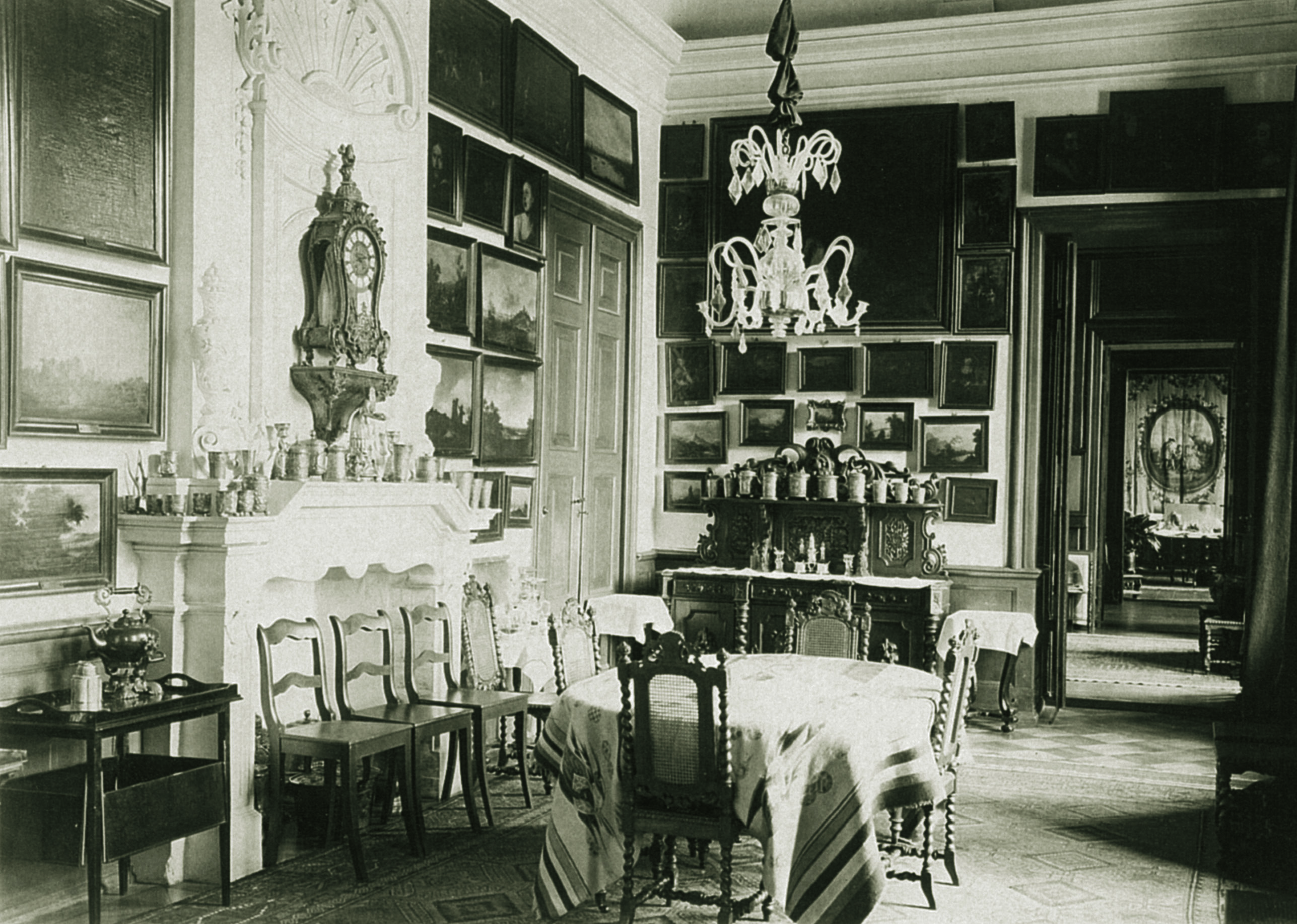
Dining room

== Architecture ==
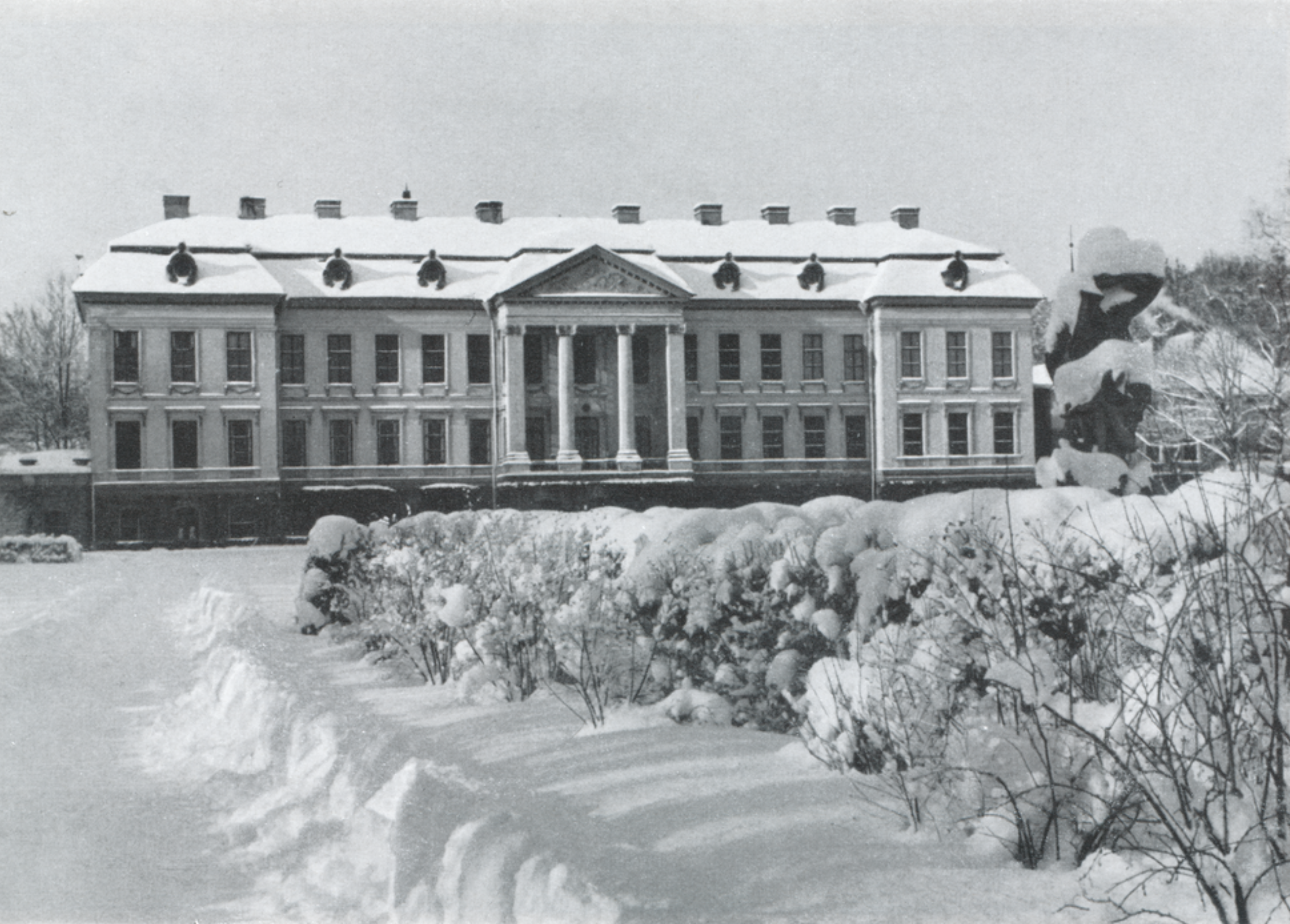
Friedrichstein palace in winter around 1930

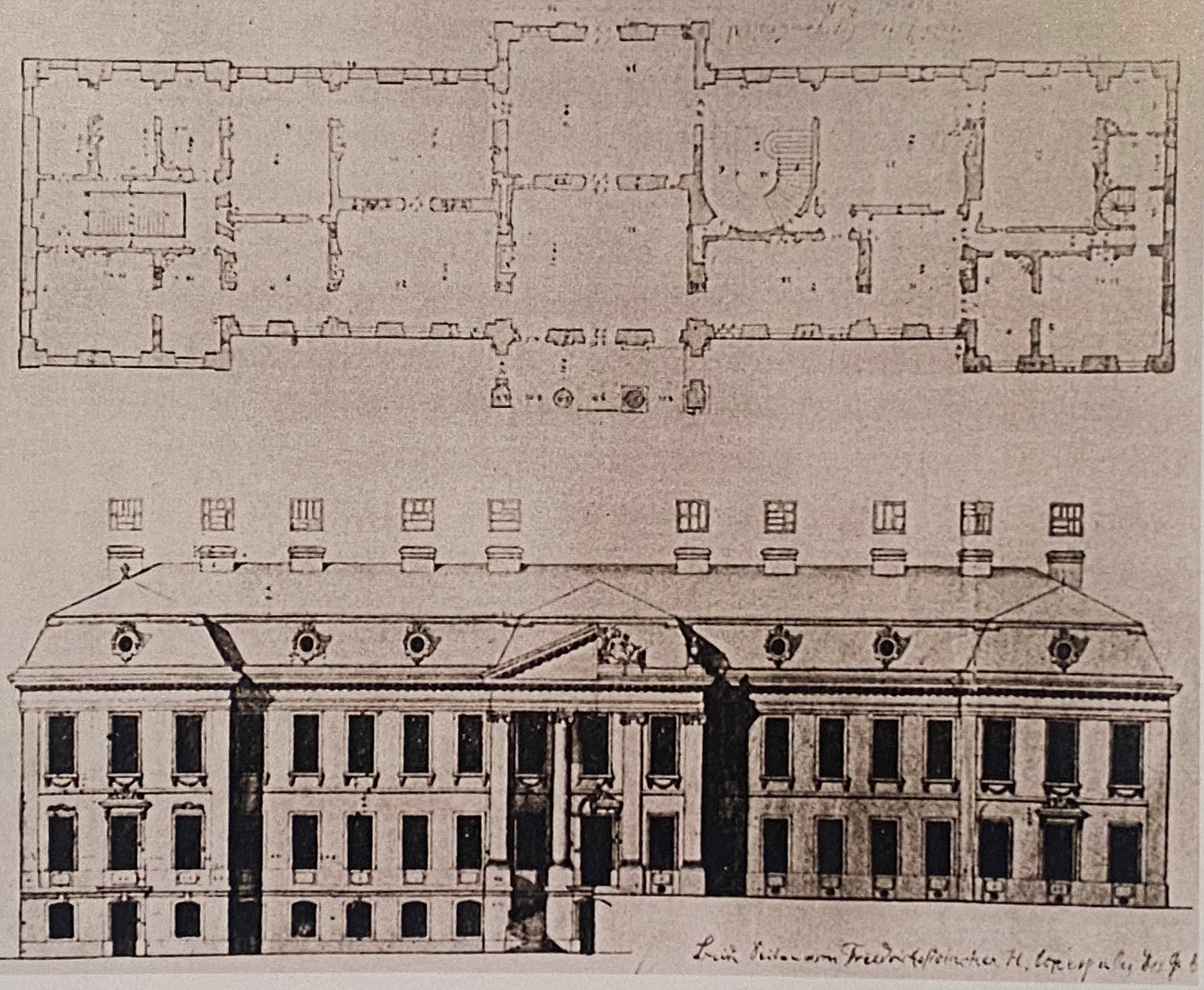
Plan and elevation by Jean de Bodt

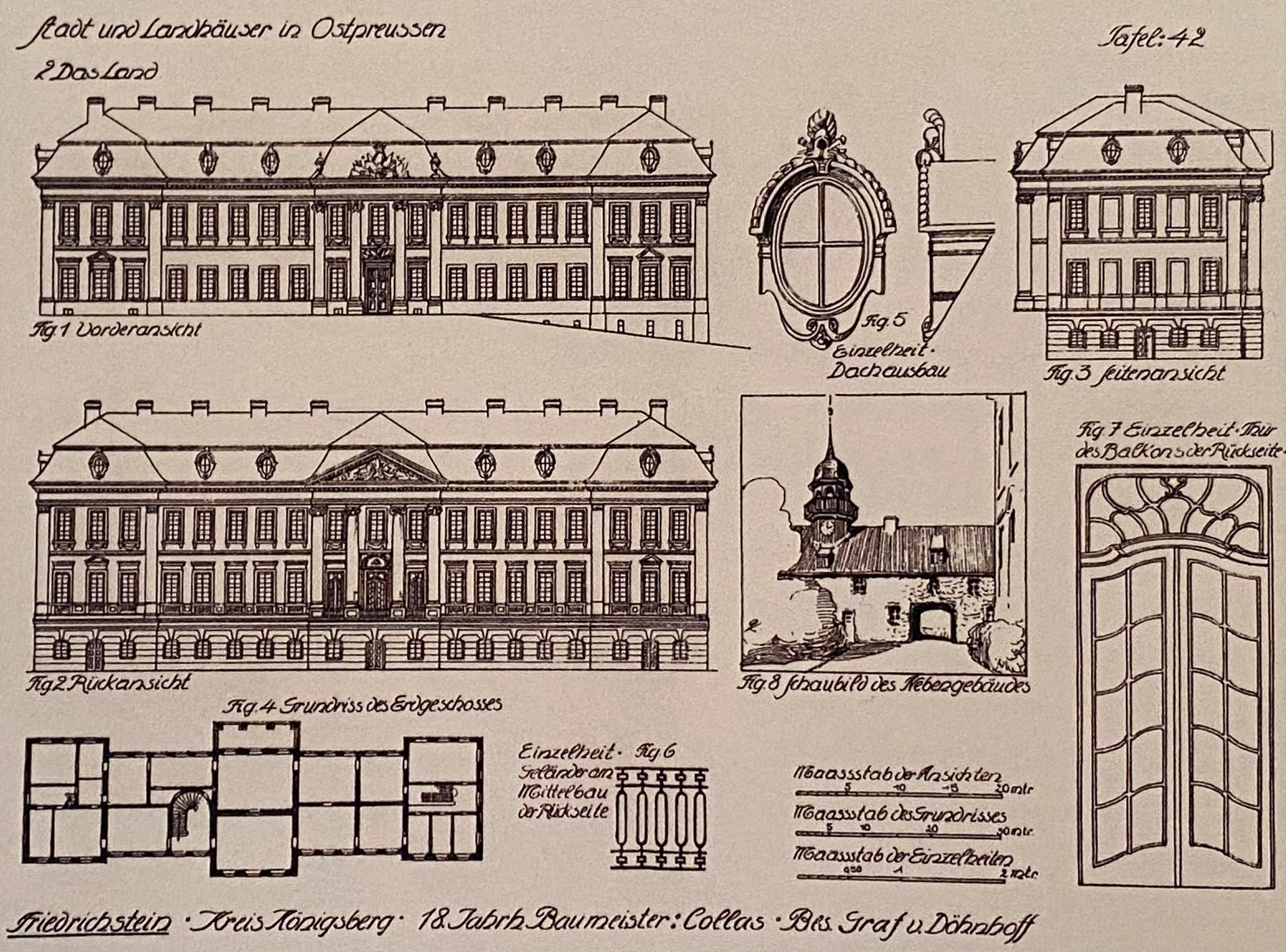
Elevations of Friedrichstein Palace by Richard Dethlefsen (1918)

In 1701, Prussia was elevated from ducal status to royal status, and its new king, Frederick I of Prussia (1657–1713), wished to see his kingdom to be provided with some magnificent baroque palaces for reasons of cultural representation. Hence, the East Prussian nobility constructed a range of so-called ‘royal palaces’. The counts von Dönhoff created Friedrichstein and Dönhoffstädt. The counts Dohna built Schlobitten and Schlodien. The counts Finck von Finckenstein erected Finckenstein Palace, and the counts Waldburg constructed Capustigall. Dönhoffstädt was built by a brother of Otto Magnus and was modelled after Friedrichstein.

The palace constructed between 1709 and 1714 was considered one of the most beautiful stately homes in Prussia. It had 19 axes and was two-story (with a high basement and a mansard roof). The façade was almost 100 meters long and housed over 110 rooms. The rooms were decorated in the Rococo style between 1750 and 1770. On the courtyard side there was a portico with Ionic columns, and on the garden side there was a similar loggia. The pediment was decorated with decorative exotic trees growing in oak barrels with massive hoops. It stood on a hill, which gave the impression of lightness despite its large size.

The garden front is modelled after the Zeughaus in Berlin, also designed by Jean de Bodt. This front was considered as exceptional design, and probably Jean de Bodt's masterpiece.

An expansive view was provided from the windows of both longer walls; from the garden side – to an elongated pond (probably the Pregoła oxbow lake). Next to the palace, surrounded by vast deciduous forests, a French-style park was organized. Natural landscape parks are enriched with artificial waterfalls, caves, etc.

Friedrichstein housed a valuable series of tapestries dating back to around 1630, depicting scenes from the life of Alexander the Great, designed by Jacob Jordaens.

== Literature ==
- Sieber, Helmut (1958). Schlösser und Herrensitz in Ost- und Westpreussen – Nach alten Stichen und Zeichnungen (in German). Frankfurt am Main: Wolfgang Weidlich. pp. 41–42.
- Dönhoff, Marian (1962). Namen die keiner mehr nennt (in German). Köln: Eugen Diederichs Verlag.
- von Lorck, Carl (1965). Landschlösser und Gutshäuser in Ost- und Westpreußen (in German). Frankfurt am Main: Weidlich. pp. 219, 221.
- Heckmann, Hermann (1998). Baumeister des Barock und Rokoko in Brandenburg-Preussen (in German). Berlin: Verlag für Bauwesen. p. 506. ISBN 3-345-00631-6.
- Heck, Kilian; Thielemann, Christian (2019). Friedrichstein: Das Schloss der Grafen von Dönhoff in Ostpreußen (in German). München: Deutscher Kunstverlag. p. 380. ISBN 978-3422073616.
