= Marion Dönhoff =

German publisher (1909–2002)

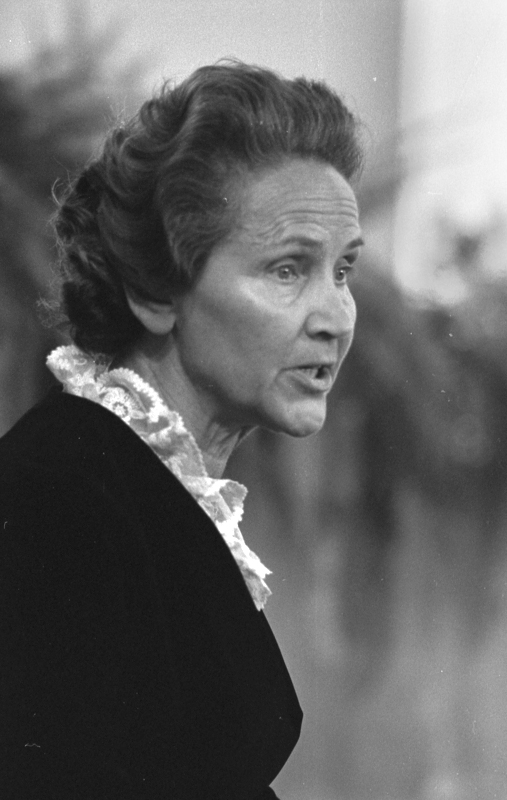
- Dönhoff in 1971
- Born: 2 December 1909; Friedrichstein Palace
- Died: 11 March 2002; Castle Crottorf
- Occupations: Journalist, resistance fighter, editor-in-chief
- Employer: Die Zeit
- Relatives: Christoph Graf Dönhoff,
- Awards: Friedenspreis des Deutschen Buchhandels (Alfred Grosser, 1971); Four Freedoms Award – Freedom of Speech (Middelburg, 1994); Reinhold Maier Medal (1996); Theodor Heuss Award (1966); Bruno Kreisky Prize for the Political Book (1999); (1999); Brückepreis; Joseph E. Drexel award (1964)

Marion Hedda Ilse Gräfin von Dönhoff (2 December 1909 – 11 March 2002) was a German journalist and publisher who participated in the resistance against Nazism, along with Helmuth James Graf von Moltke, Peter Yorck von Wartenburg, and Claus Schenk Graf von Stauffenberg. After the war, she became one of Germany's leading journalists and intellectuals, working for more than 55 years as an editor and later publisher of the Hamburg-based weekly newspaper Die Zeit.

== Early life and ancestry ==
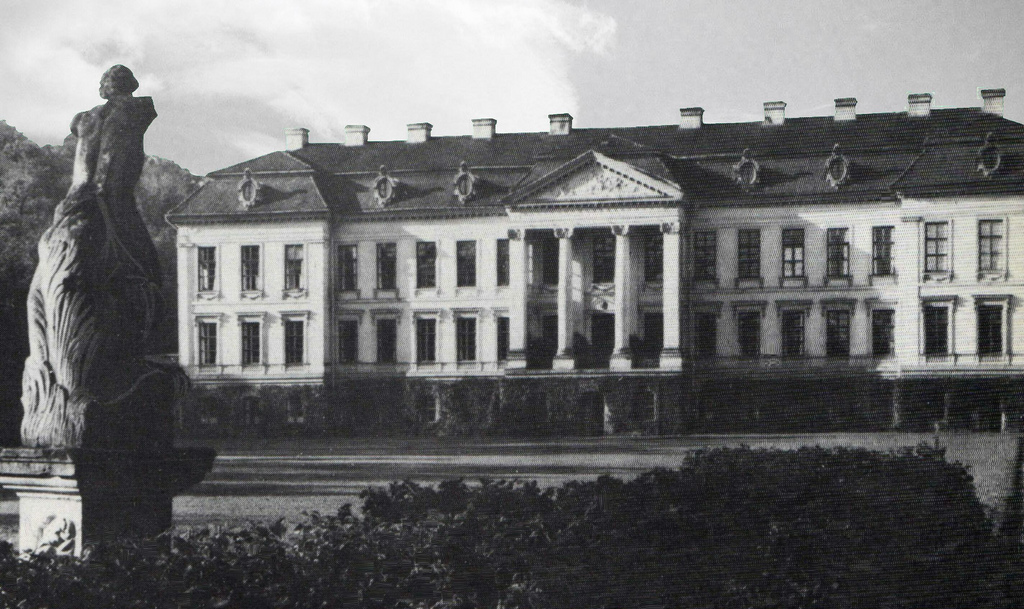
Schloss Friedrichstein, the family's estate in East Prussia in 1927. It was the largest castle in East Prussia. The Red Army destroyed it in January 1945.

Dönhoff was born in East Prussia in 1909 into an old aristocratic House of Dönhoff at Friedrichstein Palace (now in the Guryevsky District of the Russian oblast of Kaliningrad). She was the youngest daughter of Count August von Dönhoff (1845–1920), a diplomat and member of the Prussian House of Lords and the German Parliament, and his wife, Maria von Lepel (1869–1940), daughter of Wilhelm Friedrich Karl von Lepel (1829–1888) and Countess Helene von Schlippenbach (1835–1917). As a diplomat, her father was located in Washington for some time, and became a close friend of Senator Carl Schurz. Dönhoff discusses in her memoirs her father's involvement in one of the last episodes of the Indian wars, the White River War.

== Biography ==
Marion studied economics at Frankfurt, where National Socialist sympathizers were said to have called her the red countess for her defiance once they gained power in 1933. She left Germany soon after, moving to Basel, Switzerland, where she earned her doctorate. She later returned to her family home at Quittainen in 1938, and joined the resistance movement, which led to questioning by the Gestapo after a failed assassination attempt on Hitler in 1944. Although many of her fellow resistance activists were executed, she was released reportedly because her name was not found in any of the documents seized by the Nazis.

In January 1945, as Soviet troops rolled into the region, Dönhoff fled East Prussia, travelling seven weeks on horseback before reaching Hamburg. She recounted her journey in a 1962 book of essays called Names No One Mentions Anymore. The castle in which she grew up and which was destroyed by the Red Army in January 1945, is within the borders of what is now part of Russia (Kaliningrad oblast), yet she was one of the first public figures to endorse the finality of the border between Germany and Poland, which had been established after the Second World War.

In 1946, Dönhoff joined the fledgling, Hamburg-based intellectual weekly Die Zeit as political editor. In August 1954, she temporarily left the newspaper in protest against articles by Richard Tüngel (who had published, inter alia, a text of Nazi constitutional lawyer Carl Schmitt) and went to London to work for The Observer. Soon afterwards, however, she returned to Hamburg, and was promoted to deputy editor-in-chief in 1955, then editor-in-chief in 1968, and publisher in 1972. She was elected a Foreign Honorary Member of the American Academy of Arts and Sciences in 1990.

She was involved in helping refugees settle in West Germany from East Germany and other parts of Europe.

At the time of her death on 11 March 2002, aged 92, Dönhoff was still co-publisher of the influential newspaper. She was the author of more than twenty books, including political and historical analyses of Germany as well as commentary on US foreign policy. Among many international distinctions, Dönhoff was awarded honorary doctorates by Columbia University and Georgetown University.

== Published works ==
=== English ===
- Foe into Friend: The Makers of the New Germany from Konrad Adenauer to Helmut Schmidt, translated by Gabriele Annan, Palgrave Macmillan, 1982; ISBN 0-312-29692-4
- "A UN Volunteer Force: The Prospects", New York Review of Books, 15 July 1993 (contributor)
- Before the Storm: Memories of My Youth in Old Prussia, translated by Jean Steinberg (original title: Kindheit in Ostpreußen), with a foreword by George F. Kennan (1990); ISBN 0394582551

=== German ===
- Namen die keiner mehr nennt, Eugen Diederichs Verlag, Köln 1962
- Amerikanische Wechselbäder : Beobachtungen und Kommentare aus vier Jahrzehnten, Stuttgart, 1983
- Weit ist der Weg nach Osten: Berichte und Betrachtungen aus fünf Jahrzehnten
- Kindheit in Ostpreußen, 1988
- Preußen—Maß und Maßlosigkeit, 1990
- Die Biene, Bibliogr. Inst. + Brockhaus, 1993; ISBN 3-411-08621-1
- Meyers Kleine Kinderbibliothek: Groß und Klein, Bibliographisches Institut & F.A. Brockhaus AG, 1993; ISBN 3-411-08641-6
- 'Um der Ehre willen', Erinnerungen an die Freunde vom 20 Juli., Berlin 1994,

== Awards and honors ==
- 1971: Peace Prize of the German Book Trade
- 1982: Honorary Senator of the University of Hamburg
- 1990: Member of the American Academy of Arts and Sciences
- 1994: Four Freedoms Award for the Freedom of Speech
- 1999: Honorary citizen of the city of Hamburg

== Bibliography ==
- Dönhoff, Marion (1994). Um der Ehre willen: Erinnerungen an die Freunde vom 20 Juli [For the Sake of Honour: Memories of the Friends of 20 July] (in German) (1st ed.). Berlin: Siedler. ISBN 978-3-88680-532-7. LCCN 95155981. OCLC 31222432. OL 870786M.
- Heck, Kilian; Thielemann, Christian (2006). Friedrichstein. Das Schloß der Grafen von Dönhoff in Ostpreußen [Friedrichstein. The castle of the Counts of Dönhoff in East Prussia] (in German). München: Deutscher Kunstverlag. ISBN 3-422-06593-8. LCCN 2007385459. OCLC 76949161. OL 16261486M.
- Schlabrendorff, Fabian (1946). Schulze-Gaevernitz, Gero (ed.). Offiziere gegen Hitler [Officers against Hitler] (in German). Zürich: Europa Verlag.
- Schlabrendorff, Fabian (1990) [1945]. Offiziere gegen Hitler [Officers against Hitler] (in German). Germany: Siedler. ISBN 978-3886800964.
