= Zeughaus =

Museum building in Berlin

Coordinates: 52°31′4″N 13°23′49″E

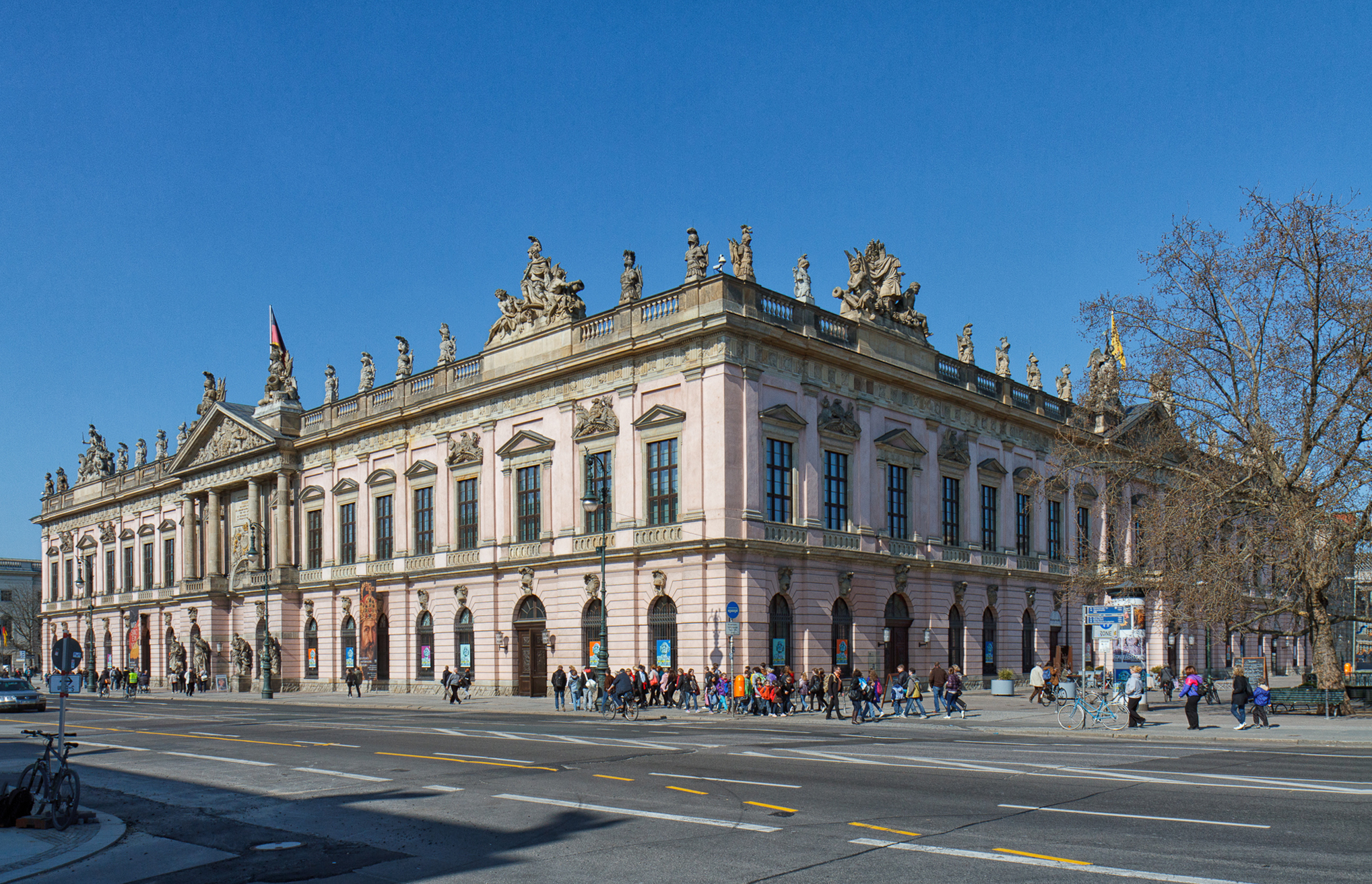
Zeughaus

The Zeughaus (German: [ˈt͡sɔɪ̯kˌhaʊ̯s], Arsenal) is a listed building and the oldest structure on Unter den Linden boulevard in the historic centre of Berlin. Erected from 1695 to 1706 according to plans by Johann Arnold Nering, Martin Grünberg, Andreas Schlüter and Jean de Bodt in Baroque style, it was later converted into a Prussian Hall of Fame. Damaged during the Allied bombing in World War II, it was rebuilt from 1949 to 1967 as part of the Forum Fridericianum. Since 2003, it has been home to the Deutsches Historisches Museum (German Historic Museum). Since June 2021 it is closed for necessary renovations and for the renewal of the Permanent Exhibition probably until 2031.

== History ==
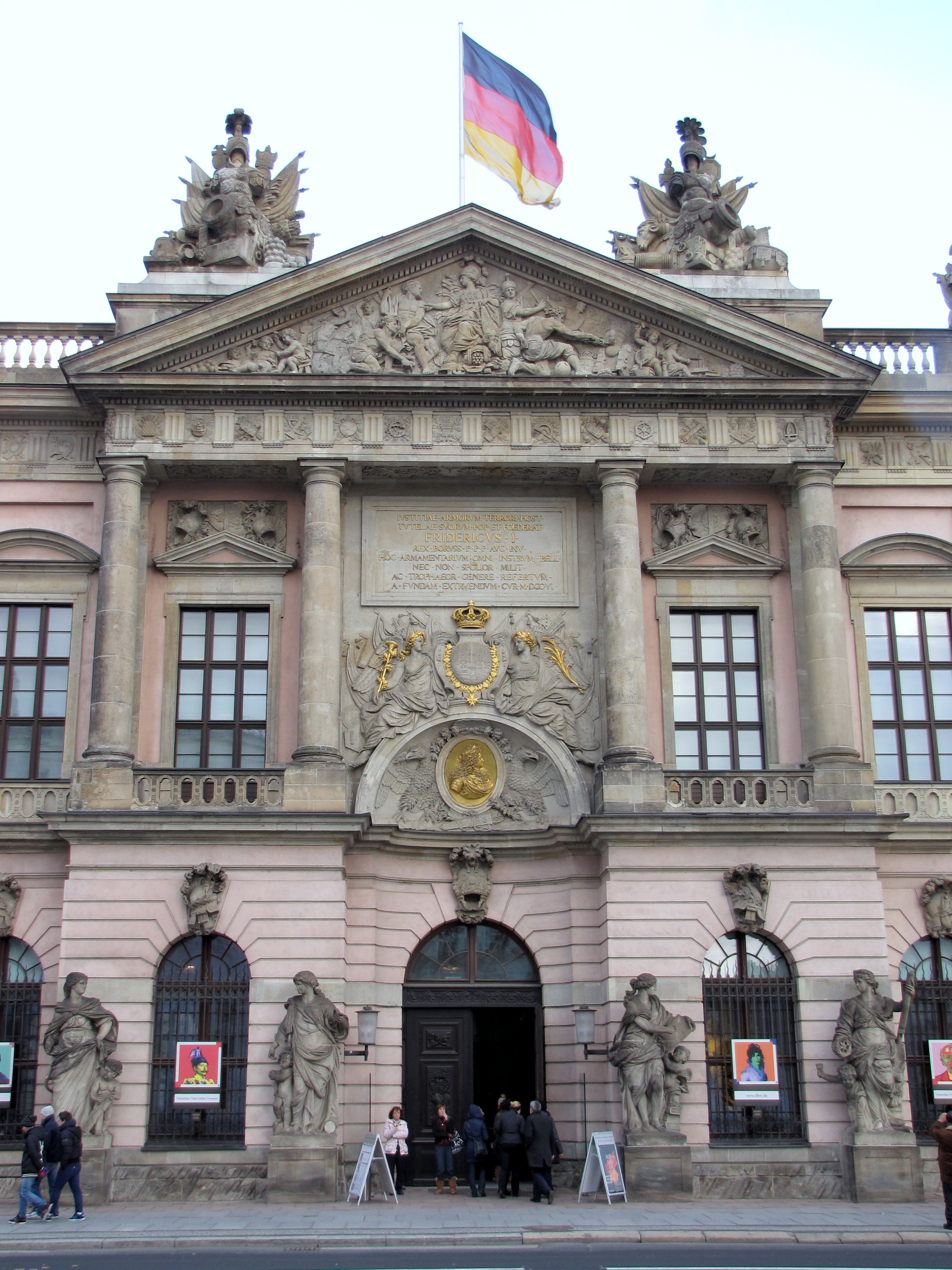
Main entrance on Unter den Linden

The Zeughaus is the oldest structure at Unter den Linden. It was built by Frederick III, Elector of Brandenburg between 1695 and 1730 in the Baroque style, to be used as an artillery arsenal for the display of cannons from Brandenburg and Prussia. The first building master was Johann Arnold Nering. After his death in 1695, he was followed by Martin Grünberg, then Andreas Schlüter and finally Jean de Bodt. Andreas Schlüter designed the keystones above the round-arch windows in the form of heads of giants. Georg Friedrich Hitzig (1811-1881) constructed the monumental flight of steps to the upper floor of the north wing and also a roof over the courtyard. The building was converted into a military museum in 1875.

On 21st March 1943, Heroes Memorial Day, Rudolf von Gersdorff tried, but failed to assassinate by suicide bombing Adolf Hitler, during the opening of an exhibition in this museum. This was one of Hitler's last public appearances before a mass audience.

From 1949 to 1965 the Zeughaus was restored after heavy war damage, the interior being completely redesigned. In 1952, the government of the German Democratic Republic opened the Museum for German History in the Zeughaus, which presented the history of Germany, especially in the modern era, from a Communist point of view. Today, the Zeughaus is the site of the Deutsches Historisches Museum (German Historical Museum).
