= Drogosze =

- Village
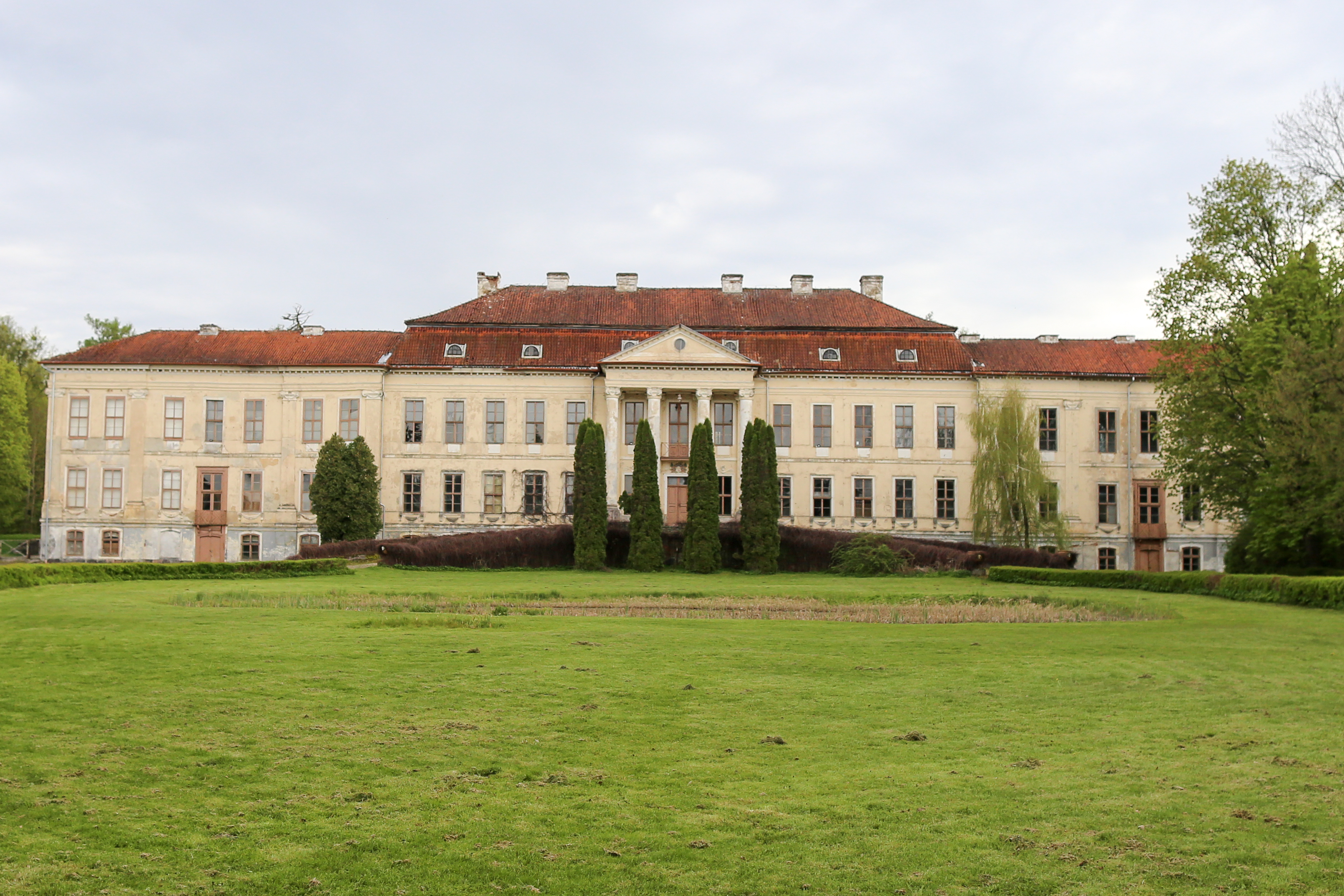
- Baroque Drogosze Palace

- Location within Poland
- Coordinates: 54°12′28″N 21°14′53″E
- Country: Poland
- Voivodeship: Warmian-Masurian
- County: Kętrzyn
- Gmina: Barciany

Population
  - Total: 597
- Time zone: UTC+1 (CET)
  - Summer (DST): UTC+2 (CEST)
- Postal code: 11-410
- Vehicle registration: NKE

Drogosze [drɔˈɡɔʂɛ] is a village in the administrative district of Gmina Barciany, within Kętrzyn County, Warmian-Masurian Voivodeship, in northern Poland, close to the border with the Kaliningrad Oblast of Russia.

The local landmark is the Baroque Drogosze Palace, built in 1710–1714.
