= Marinated mushrooms =

Mushrooms preserved using vinegar

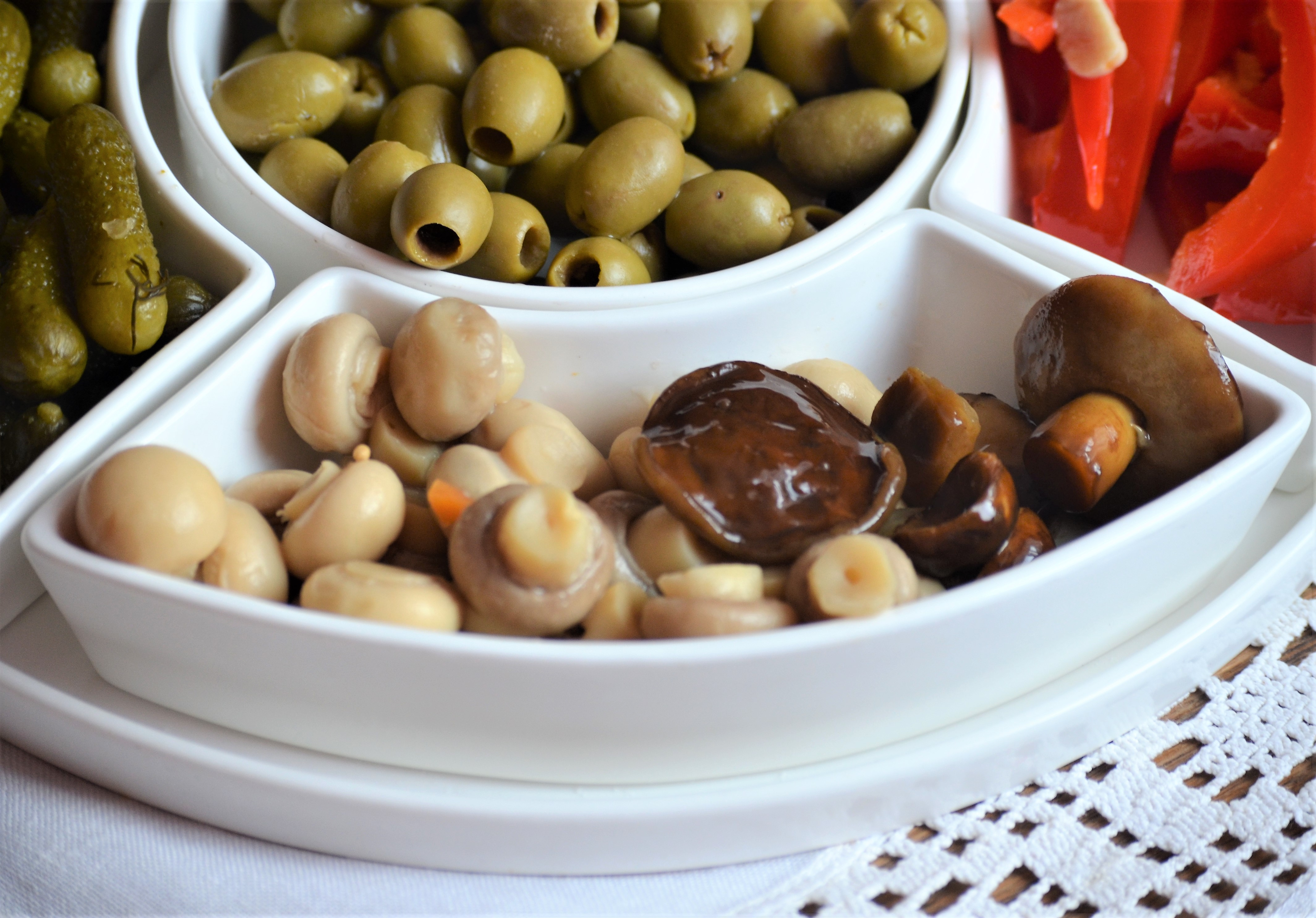
Marinated mushrooms

Marinated mushrooms are forest or cultivated edible mushrooms preserved in various ways using vinegar and possibly additionally pasteurized.

Marinated mushrooms are a traditional dish in Polish cuisine and are characteristic of other national cuisines as well.

The marinating process gives the mushrooms a characteristic tangy taste and attractive appearance. Marinated mushrooms can be made at home or produced on an industrial scale.

== Preparation according to Polish tradition ==
Marinated mushrooms are prepared from fresh mushrooms, which are first cooked and then marinated in a vinegar brine with spices.

=== Marination ===
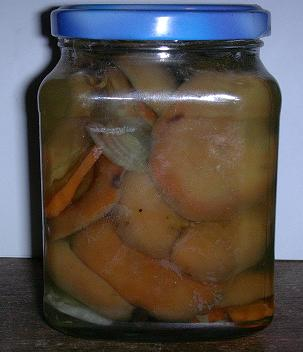
Marinated delicious milk cap

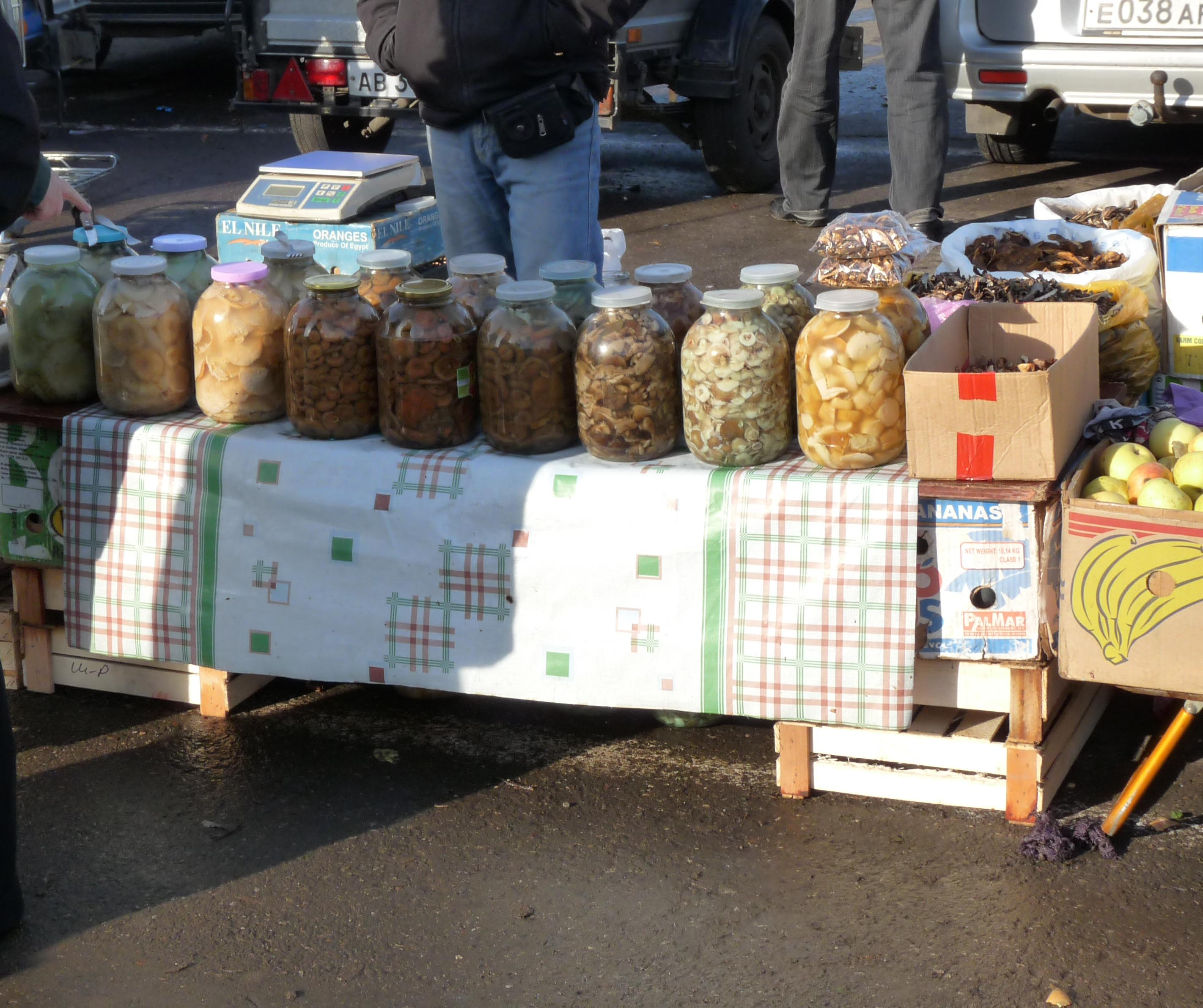
Marinated mushrooms sold at a market in Samara, Russia

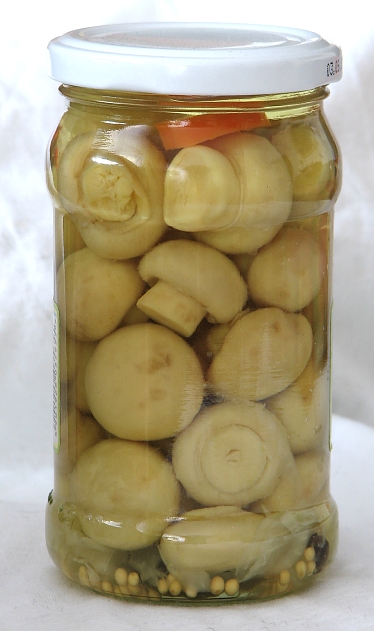
Marinated agaricus

Marination, including mushrooms, is achieved by pouring a solution of hot vinegar, which is a faster method of preservation, providing better control over texture and salt content, but with a less rich flavor than fermentation-based pickling. The final concentration of vinegar is around 2.5%. Marinated products are additionally subjected to temperature treatment to prevent spoilage. The flavor can be enhanced by adding spices or sugar.

Suitable mushrooms for marinating include boletus, delicious milk cap, suillus, leccinum, honey fungus, tricholoma, agaricus, and girolle, preferably small, young, and firm ones.

One can also use young and healthy larger mushrooms divided into halves or quarters. Different types of mushrooms should be marinated separately. They should be cleaned, trimmed, and rinsed to remove dirt and sand.

=== Recipe ===
The proportions of ingredients for 1 kg of mushrooms are: 20 g of salt per 1 liter of water in which the mushrooms are blanched, 100 g of onion, 1.25 cups (~300 mL) of water, 1.25 cups (~300 mL) of vinegar (10%), 50 g of sugar, 10 g of salt, 5 g of spices (pepper, allspice, bay leaves). The mushrooms should be placed in a small amount of water boiled with salt and whole or halved onions. After cooking almost until soft, they should be removed, drained, placed in jars, and left to cool. The vinegar solution is prepared by boiling water with vinegar, sugar, salt, and spices; it is poured over the mushrooms after cooling. Small onions scalded with water and blanched carrot slices can be added to the jars. Then the jars can be sealed.

=== Production ===
In addition to individual production of this dish by consumers, marinated mushrooms are also produced industrially. In retail, marinated mushrooms such as agaricus, girolle, bay bolete, slippery jack, boletus and delicious milk cap are available, produced by various manufacturers.

After pasteurization, their shelf life can be extended up to 3 years without the need for refrigeration.

Most commonly, pasteurized marinated mushrooms are packaged in glass jars.

=== Other preservation methods ===
In addition to mushrooms preserved using vinegar or acetic acid, mushrooms can be preserved by adding gluconolactone, temporarily preserved before further processing using a concentrated solution of table salt, known as brine.

Marinated mushrooms may also contain other additives such as vegetable oil.

In English, the equivalents of Polish marinated mushrooms are the terms "marinated" or "pickled", referring to mushrooms prepared or preserved using vinegar or acetic acid.

A different method of preserving fresh mushrooms is by pickling them and optionally pasteurizing the already pickled mushrooms.

=== Methods of consumption ===
In Poland, marinated mushrooms are often served as an accompaniment to game dishes, pork, beef, and poultry. They can be consumed as an appetizer and a snack with alcoholic beverages. Finely chopped marinated mushrooms are also an ingredient in tartar sauce. They are also used for garnishing.

=== Traditional Polish products ===
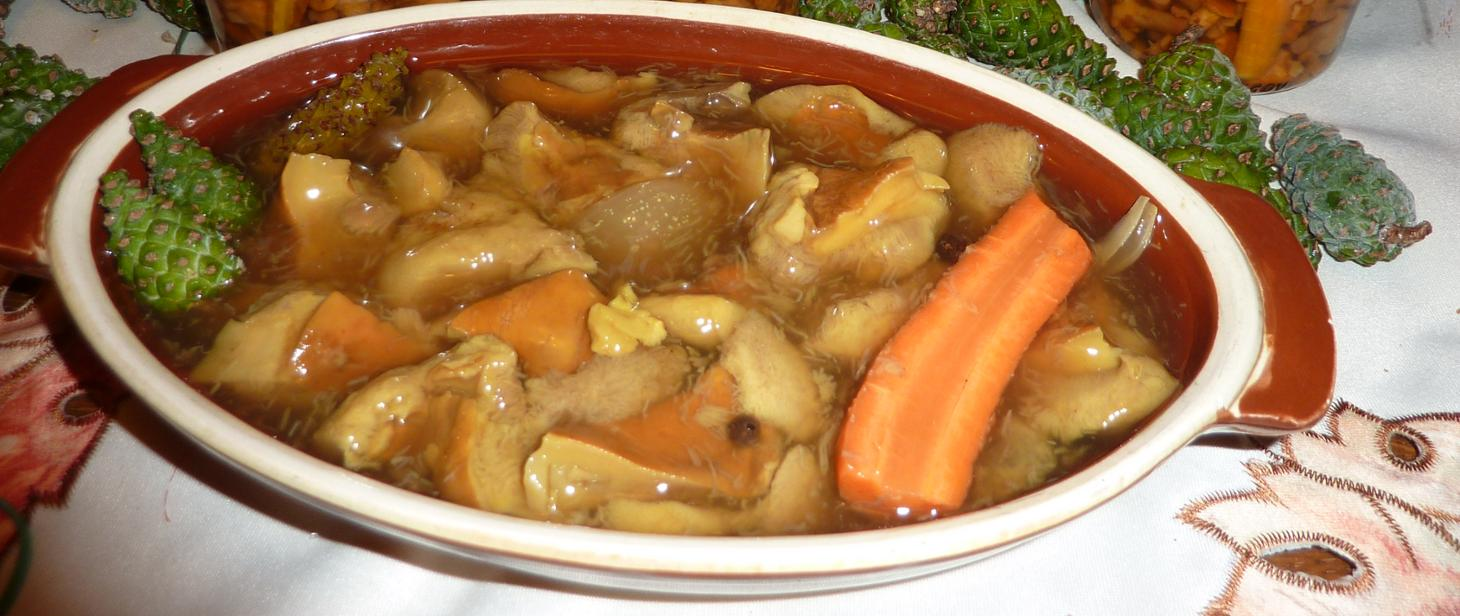
Marinated mushrooms with pine cone

Several variations of marinated mushrooms have been registered by the Ministry of Agriculture and Rural Development as traditional products.

- Greater Poland cep – the characteristic feature of this product is a clear ("crystalline") marinade without sediment. The fruiting bodies of the ceps are first soaked in a solution of water and wine, then boiled in a vinegar marinade with spices, after which the mushrooms are rinsed and covered with hot, fresh marinade and pasteurized twice with a 24-hour interval;
- Marinated mushrooms with pine cone from the West Pomeranian Voivodeship have a tradition dating back to 1955. At that time, they began to be prepared by adding honey and a green pine cone to the vinegar marinade during cooking, which soften and enrich the marinade's aromas. These mushrooms, prepared in this way, are served with game dishes, pork, beef, and poultry;
- Bug marinated mushrooms from the Podlaskie Voivodeship do not deviate from the general recipe but may be marinated with paprika, with the addition of garlic, and differ in the amount of sugar in the marinade and the concentration of vinegar.

== Other cuisines ==
The tradition of preserving mushrooms through marinating, drying, and pickling has long been practiced in the kitchens of many cultures: European, Asian, and Latin American. Marinating mushrooms in vinegar is characteristic of many national cuisines, such as Russian, Belarusian, Estonian, and Jewish (both Ashkenazi and Sephardic). In French cuisine, vinaigrette is used to marinate mushrooms. Marinated mushrooms are eagerly purchased by Chinese and Japanese consumers. In Japanese cuisine, marinated shiitake mushrooms are added to numerous ready-made dishes as one of the ingredients or as decoration (for example, shiitake mushrooms can be marinated in a solution of rice vinegar with added sugar, salt, and pepper). Marinated mushrooms are also produced in India. The popularizer of mushroom marinating in contemporary Swedish cuisine is chef Per Morberg, who recommends serving them with game, pork, and roast beef. Mushrooms are traditionally marinated in Mediterranean countries, alongside marinating vegetables and fish. In Italian cuisine, they are served as one of the elements of antipasto. Wild or cultivated mushrooms are marinated in Mexican cuisine, where setas con vinagre, or wild mushrooms in vinegar, are a traditional appetizer in Veracruz.

== History ==
The Babylonians were already using vinegar as a means of preserving and pickling food – the first mention of this dates back to around 3000 years AC. However, the first recipes for preparing marinated mushrooms appeared in cookbooks in the mid-17th century.

In English cuisine, marinated mushrooms were traditionally added to stews of meat, poultry, fish, and eggs. In Polish cuisine, they were used in roast dishes.

=== In cookbooks ===
Mikołaj Rej in Żywot człowieka poczciwego wrote about drying and salting mushrooms as methods of preserving them, but did not mention marinating in vinegar, even though in the same paragraph he described the preparation of pickled beets and fennel.

In the first Polish cookbook, Compendium ferculorum, albo Zebranie potraw from 1682, authored by Stanisław Czerniecki, the master chef of the Kraków duke, Aleksander Michał Lubomirski, various types of mushrooms essential for household needs were listed, including fresh mushrooms, dried mushrooms, fresh delicious milk cap, salted delicious milk cap, fresh agaricus, and agaricus in butter, but no mention was made of any kind of marinated mushrooms.

In Jakub Haur's book Oekonomika ziemiańska generalna from 1675 (later editions in 1744), there is no information about marinating mushrooms, although the author advises salting and smoking mushrooms in August.

During this time, in 1695, in France, the French Academy published a dictionary Le dictionnaire de l'Académie françoise, dédié au Roy, which as an illustration of the word mariné (marinate) provided the phrase des champignons marinez (marinated mushrooms). In England, marinated mushrooms were mentioned in the rural dictionary Dictionarium Rusticum & Urbanicum. Or, A Dictionary of All Sorts of Country Affairs, Handicraft, Trading, and Merchandizing by John Worlidge and Nathan Bailey, published in 1704.

In the first half of the 18th century, numerous English cookbooks contained recipes for marinating mushrooms, sometimes even several different ones. Marinating mushrooms was discussed in household manuals for both women, such as The Whole Duty of a Woman, Or, An Infallible Guide to the Fair Sex from 1737, and for men, such as The Complete family-piece; and, country gentleman, and farmer's, best guide, also published in 1737. From the latter, there is a specific recipe for cooking mushrooms in milk and using nutmeg and mace as spices. The recipe from the book for women is identical word for word.

In Johann Gottlieb Gleditsch's book on mushrooms Methodus fungorum, published in Berlin in 1753, marinated mushrooms were mentioned. Likewise, in the contemporary French culinary dictionary Dictionnaire des alimens, vins et liqueurs, leurs qualité, leurs effets etc. from 1750, there was a recipe for marinating mushrooms. In German, a recipe for marinated mushrooms appeared in Johann Georg Krünitz's Oekonomische Encyklopädie in 1776.

The English book The Accomplished Housekeeper, and Universal Cook by T. Williams, published in 1797, contained numerous examples of using marinated mushrooms in the kitchen. They were used as a flavor enhancer for meat, fish, poultry dishes, and even eggs.

During the same period in Poland, in the translated and adapted French book Kucharz doskonały by Wojciech Wielądko from 1783, there was no recipe for marinating mushrooms or any mention of them. Recipes for marinated mushrooms in vinegar appeared in a Polish cookbook from the late 18th century: the anonymous book Gospodarz doskonały, first published in Dresden in 1790, contained a recipe for marinated delicious milk caps.

In Russia, in 1792, a book titled "Новый совершенный российский повар и кандитер, или, Подробный поваренский и кандитерский словарь" was printed, containing a recipe for marinating mushrooms with the addition of pepper, ginger root, and cloves as spices. The recipe also included a brochure translated from German "О грибах, употребляемых в пищу" from 1834, which proposed pepper, bay leaves, mustard, and cloves as spices for marinating mushrooms. Marinating forest mushrooms, specifically ceps, was also suggested in the German work Neues auf Erfahrung gegründetes leichtfaßliches Kochbuch für jede Haushaltung by M. A. Salzmann from 1835.

In Poland, in the 19th century, an anonymous Polish publication Kucharka wiedeńska provided a recipe for preserving mushrooms.

Marinated mushrooms also appeared in the cookbook by Lucyna Ćwierczakiewiczowa from 1893, where the author provided a method for marinating them. She also pointed out an alternative method for marinating mushrooms, which she believed was commonly used by chefs: rinsed mushrooms should be placed in boiling, heavily salted water, and after boiling, drained and poured into jars with cold vinegar with a small amount of spices.

This dish was also mentioned in the Soviet encyclopedia "Краткая энциклопедия домашнего хозяйства" (Moscow, 1960) and in the commodity dictionary "Товарный словарь" (vol. III, Moscow, 1957).

== Cultural references ==
In Powieści mniejsze by Nikolai Gogol, depicting the daily life of the society in which the writer lived, one can read about various types of marinated mushrooms, such as those marinated in cherry vinegar with cloves and walnuts or those marinated with currant leaves and nutmeg, served as appetizers by Pulcheria Ivanovna to her guests.

In Mikhail Bulgakov's novel The Master and Margarita, Behemoth accompanies his vodka with marinated boletus while Woland converses with Stepan Likhodeev in the latter's bedroom at Sadovaya 302a. In the same novel, Arkady Apollonovich Sempleyarov, the chairman of the Acoustic Committee of Moscow theaters, is eventually transferred to the position of manager of a forest produce collection point in Bryansk, causing the residents of Moscow to now eat salted mushrooms and marinated boletus, they cannot praise them enough and are enthusiastic about the fact that Arkady Apollonovich changed his job.

In Olga Tokarczuk's short story Przetwory from the collection Opowiadania bizarne (2018), a fifty-year-old unemployed man sustains himself on preserves prepared by his mother before her death. His last meal consists of the contents of a jar labeled Marinated Mushrooms, 2005. These "mushrooms" turned out to be poisonous – a mistake in the labeling was a warning that he ignored.
