= Stanisław Czerniecki =

Author of the first printed Polish-language cookbook

- Stanisław Czerniecki's coat of arms
- Born: ca. 1630s Strzyżów, Poland (possibly)
- Died: between 1698 and 1716; Wola Nieszkowska, Poland (possibly)
- Other names: Stanislaus Columbus Czerniecki
- Occupation(s): Soldier, property manager, chef

Stanisław Czerniecki (Polish pronunciation: [staˈɲiswaf t͡ʂɛrˈɲɛt͡skʲi]; fl. 1645–1698) was a Polish soldier, property manager, chef and writer, best known as the author of Compendium ferculorum, albo Zebranie potraw (A Collection of Dishes), the first cookbook written originally in the Polish language. He was an ennobled burgher who held the titular offices of royal secretary and podstoli (deputy pantler) of Zhytomyr. During much of his life he served some of the powerful magnate houses of Poland, including the Wielopolski, Zamoyski, Wiśniowiecki and Lubomirski families. It was as head chef at the court of Prince Aleksander Michał Lubomirski that Czerniecki wrote his cookery book. As a designer of spectacular banquets, he has been called "the Polish Vatel" by Karol Estreicher, although Czerniecki did not meet the tragic fate of François Vatel, the head chef at the court of the Grand Condé.

== Life ==
=== Military service and ennoblement ===
Stanisław Czerniecki came most likely from a burgher family living in Strzyżów, a town in southern Poland then owned by the Wielopolski family. Nothing else is known about his birth, family, childhood and education. In 1645 or 1646, he began his service at the court of Prince Stanisław Lubomirski, voivode of Kraków, in the castle of Nowy Wiśnicz. After Stanisław Lubomirski's death in 1649, he continued to serve his eldest son, Prince Aleksander Michał Lubomirski.

Following the 1655 Swedish invasion of Poland during the Second Northern War, Czerniecki began his military career under the command of Jan "Sobiepan" Zamoyski. He took part in the battles of Gołąb and Warsaw in 1656. After the war with Sweden, he continued his military service fighting in the battle of Chudnov against Muscovite forces in 1660 and in the battle of Brayiliv against Crimean Tatars and Cossacks (Polish–Cossack–Tatar War) in 1666.

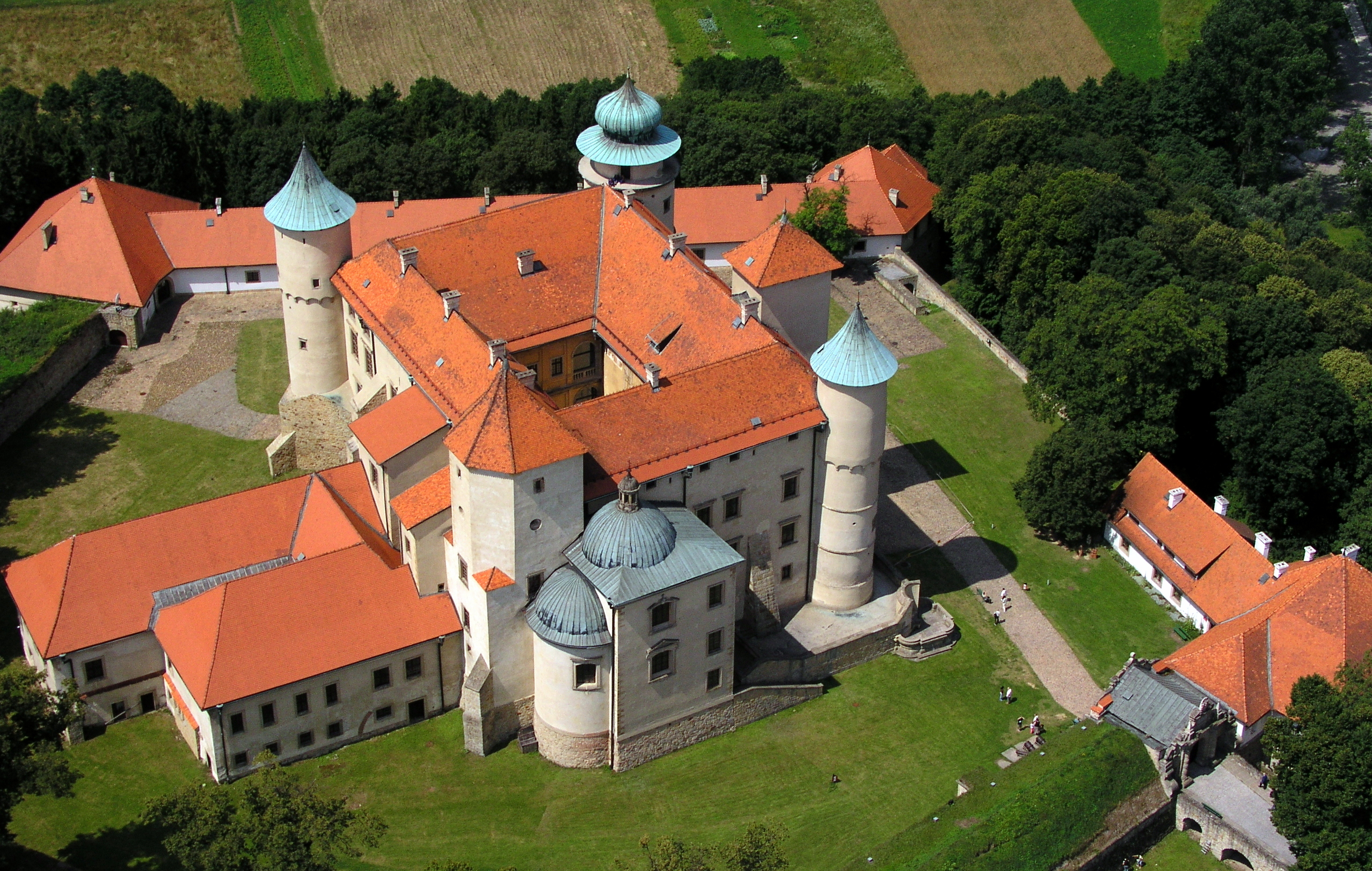
Nowy Wiśnicz Castle, seat of the Lubomirski family in the 17th century

In 1670, Czerniecki was awarded for his military exploits with the titular office of royal secretary. The royal document, issued by King Michael Wiśniowiecki, describes Czerniecki as a long-time servant to the house of Wiśniowiecki. According to Czerniecki family lore, Stanisław Czerniecki was employed as the king's chamber servant. He may have landed this job thanks to his previous military service under Zamoyski, who was King Michael's uncle and mentor.

Although Czerniecki had been previously mentioned in documents as a nobleman, he was officially ennobled by the sejm (diet) which convened in Kraków after the coronation of King John III Sobieski in 1676. The act of ennoblement recognizes his military merits, to which Prince Dymitr Jerzy Wiśniowiecki, grand hetman of the Crown, testified. The same act also granted Czerniecki a coat of arms with three ostrich feathers for the crest and charged with a white dove perched on one olive branch and holding another in its beak. From this time, Czerniecki began to be officially referred to as Stanislaus Columbus Czerniecki, where columbus is the Latin word for "dove".

=== Property manager and landowner ===
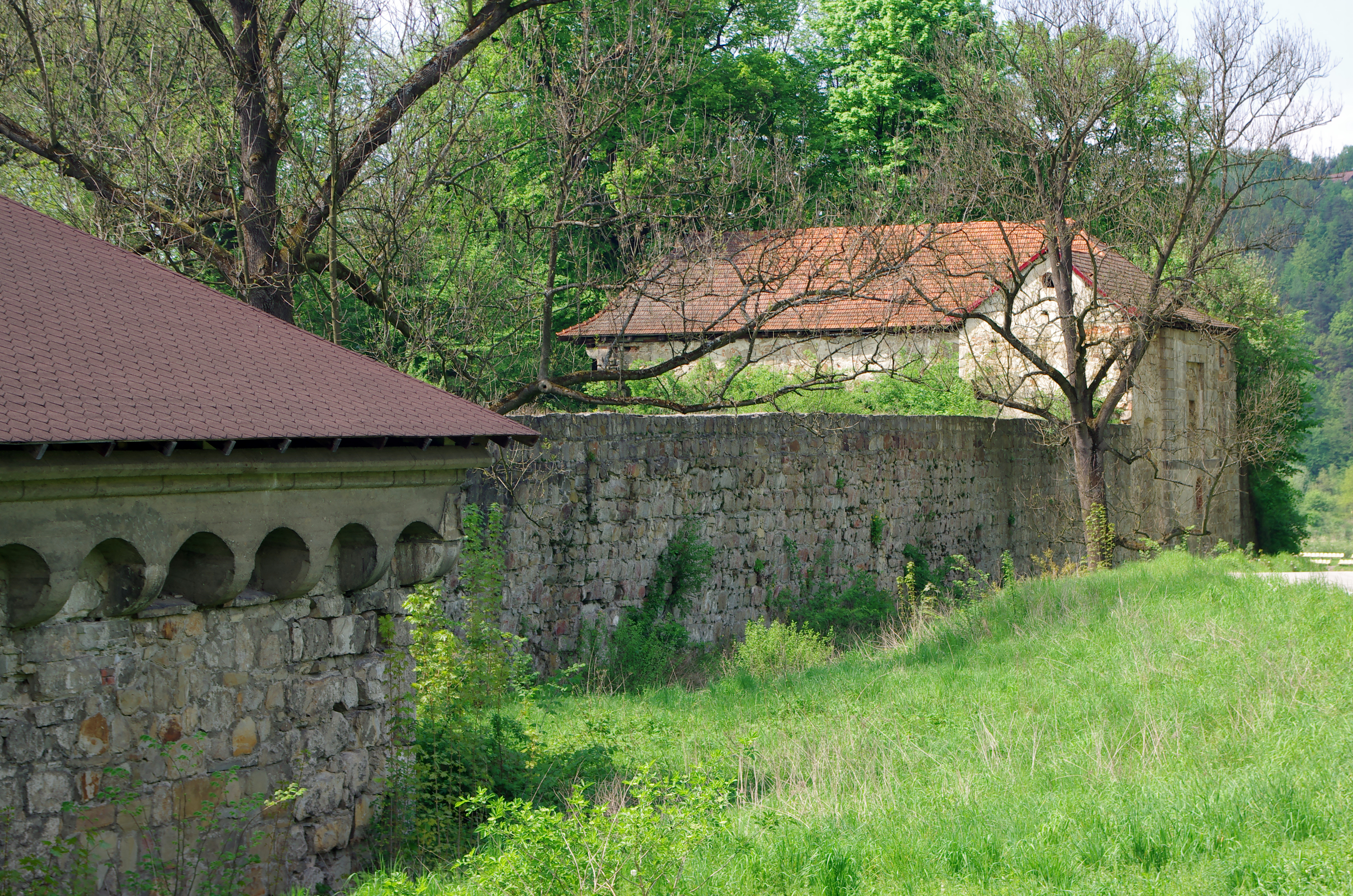
Remnants of the Rożnów Castle

Court records from 1658 mention a "noble Stanisław Czernecki", a lease-holder of a parson's estate in the village of Jasień near Brzesko, but there is no certainty that he was the same person as Stanisław Czerniecki.

Aleksander Michał Lubomirski leased his village of Połomia to Czerniecki; after Lubomirski's death, his son, Prince Józef Karol Lubomirski, granted Czerniecki a life lease of the same village. In the 1680s, Czerniecki was also a lease-holder and manager of the fee tail and castle of Rożnów, which belonged to Jan Wielopolski, grand chancellor of the Crown. During this time, the Rożnów castle served as Czerniecki's principal residence.

Czerniecki's social advancement into nobility became complete in 1689, when he purchased from Marianna Straszowa his own village of Wola Nieszkowska near Nowy Wiśnicz. The village, which comprised a manor and a church, would remain the seat of the Czerniecki family for generations. In 1694, King John III bestowed on Czerniecki the titular office of podstoli (deputy pantler) of Żytomierz (now Zhytomyr, Ukraine).

=== Family ===
Czerniecki was married at least twice. By his first wife, Anna Rożanecka, he had no fewer than three children – Michał Jan Czerniecki, Teresa Konstancja Czerniecka and Joanna Czerniecka. He married Joanna off to Wojciech Nidecki in 1684 and Teresa Konstancja to Jan Miłkowski in 1686. Court records have been preserved that document Czerniecki's lengthy litigations with his sons-in-law over dowry amounts. Before 1683, Czerniecki married Agnieszka Bielska, with whom he had two children – Anna Czerniecka, married off to Joachim Krzeczowski in 1698, and Antoni Czerniecki. The latter inherited Wola Nieszkowska and married Jadwiga Wyzemberkówna in 1716.

== Works ==
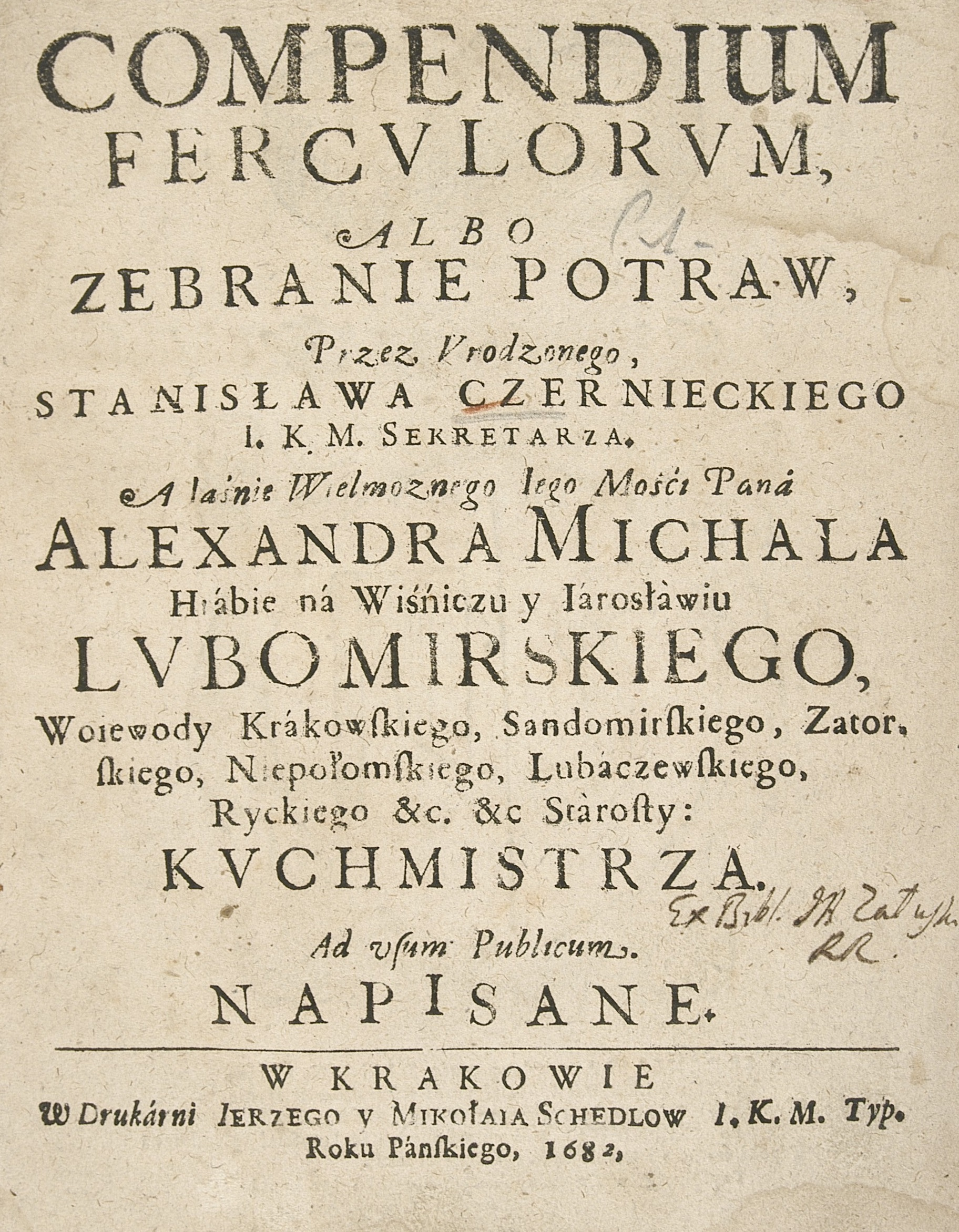
Title page of the 1682 edition of Compendium ferculorum

Czerniecki wrote two books – a cookbook and a pamphlet describing the court of Stanisław Lubomirski and the wedding of the latter's granddaughter, Krystyna Lubomirska.

=== A Collection of Dishes ===
Compendium ferculorum is the first cookbook to be written originally in Polish. The bilingual, Latin-Polish title, means "A collection of dishes". (Note: The Latin Compendium ferculorum and the Polish zebranie potraw both translate as "a collection of dishes". Albo means "or" in Polish.) Czerniecki signed his work as "master chef" (kuchmistrz) to Prince Aleksander Michał Lubomirski and dedicated it to the latter's wife and his own "most charitable lady and benefactress", (Note: Polish: Pani i Dobrodziejce swojej Wielce M[iłoś]ciwej.) Princess Helena Tekla Lubomirska née Ossolińska.

The book served as an inspiration for the portrayal of an Old Polish banquet in Pan Tadeusz, the Polish national epic.

=== The Court of Stanisław Lubomirski ===
Czerniecki's other book, published in 1697, is a short pamphlet entitled The court, grandeur, eminence and governance of His Serene Grace Stanisław Lubomirski of Blessed Memory, Prince of the Roman Empire, Count of Wiśnicz and Jarosław, Voivode of Kraków, [etc.] (Note: Polish: Dwór, Wspaniałość, powaga i rządy Jaśnie Oświeconego Książęcia J[ego] M[ości] Państwa Rzymskiego, Świętej Pamięci Stanisława hrabi na Wiśniczu i Jarosławiu Lubomirskiego, Wojewody Krakowskiego...) The booklet also contains a description of the wedding between Krystyna Lubomirska (Stanisław Lubomirski's granddaughter and Aleksander Michał Lubomirski's niece) and Feliks Kazimierz Potocki. The wedding reception was hosted by the bride's father, Jerzy Sebastian Lubomirski, and its preparation overseen by Czerniecki himself.

== Sources ==
=== Secondary ===
- Dumanowski, Jarosław (2012). "Compendium ferculorum Stanisława Czernieckiego". In Czerniecki, Stanisław. Dumanowski, Jarosław; Spychaj Magdalena, eds. (ed.). Compendium ferculorum albo Zebranie potraw (in Polish). Warszawa: Muzeum Pałac w Wilanowie. pp. 13–70. ISBN 978-83-60959-01-5.

=== Primary ===
- Czerniecki, Stanisław (1682). Compendium ferculorum, albo Zebranie potraw [A Collection of Dishes] (in Polish). Kraków: Drukarnia Jerzego i Mikołaja Schedlów. Complete scan at Polona.pl.
