= Compendium ferculorum, albo Zebranie potraw =

1682 cookbook by Stanisław Czerniecki

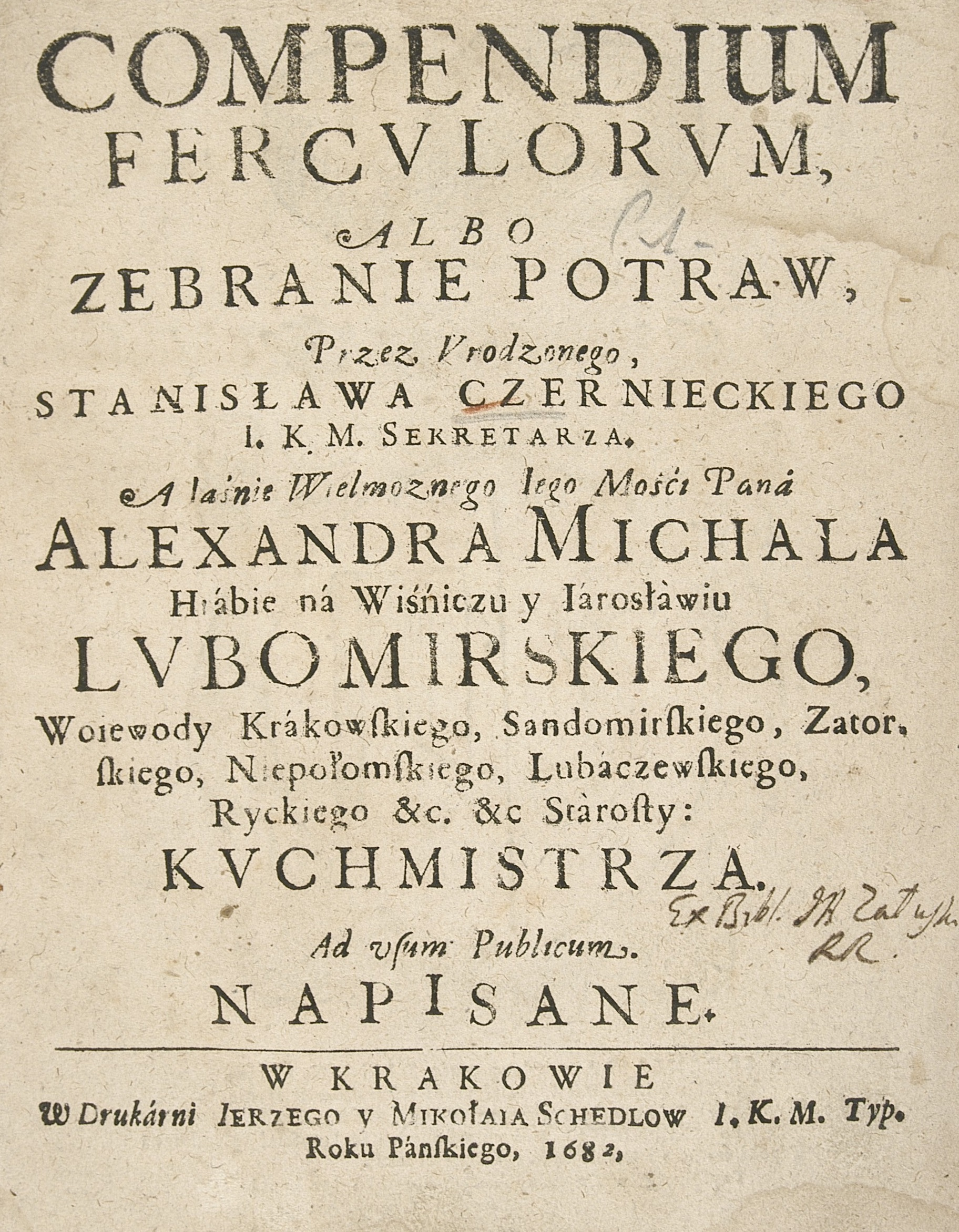
- Title page of the first edition, 1682
- Author: Stanisław Czerniecki
- Language: Middle Polish
- Subject: Cookbook
- Publisher: Drukarnia Jerzego i Mikołaja Schedlów (Jerzy and Mikołaj Schedels' Print Shop), Kraków
- Publication date: 1682
- Publication place: Poland
- Pages: 96 (first edition)

Compendium ferculorum, albo Zebranie potraw (A Collection of Dishes) is a cookbook by Stanisław Czerniecki. First put in print in 1682, it is the earliest known cookery book published originally in Polish. Czerniecki wrote it in his capacity as head chef at the court of the house of Lubomirski and dedicated it to Princess Helena Tekla Lubomirska. The book contains 333 recipes, divided into three chapters of 111 recipes each.

The chapters are devoted, respectively, to meat, fish and other dishes, and each concludes with a "master chef's secret". Czerniecki's cooking style, as is evident in his book, was typical for the luxuriant Polish Baroque cuisine, which still had a largely medieval outlook, but was gradually succumbing to novel culinary ideas coming from France. It was characterized by generous use of vinegar, sugar and exotic spices, as well as preference for spectacle over thrift.

The book was republished several times during the 18th and 19th centuries, sometimes under new titles, and had an important impact on the development of Polish cuisine. It also served as an inspiration for the portrayal of an Old Polish banquet in Pan Tadeusz, the Polish national epic.

== Context ==
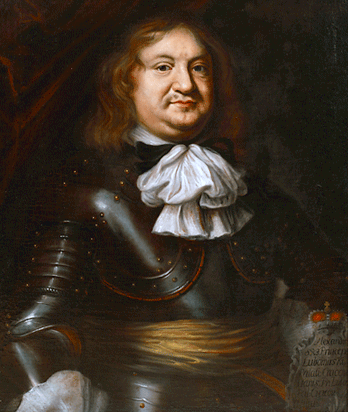
Prince Aleksander Michał Lubomirski, at whose court Compendium ferculorum was written

Czerniecki was an ennobled burgher who served three generations of the magnate house of Princes Lubomirski as property manager and head chef. He began his service in ca. 1645, initially under Stanisław Lubomirski until 1649, then under the latter's eldest son, Aleksander Michał Lubomirski, and his grandson, Józef Karol Lubomirski. Although Czerniecki's book was first published in 1682, it must have been completed before Aleksander Michał Lubomirski's death in 1677.

The original publication of Compendium ferculorum came three decades after the French cookbook entitled Le Cuisinier françois (The French [male] Cook, 1651), by François Pierre de La Varenne, started a culinary revolution that spread across Europe in the second half of the 17th century. In this new wave of French gastronomy, exotic spices were largely replaced with domestic herbs with the aim of highlighting the natural flavours of foods. Polish magnates often hired French chefs at their courts and some also held copies of Le Cuisinier françois in their libraries (including King John III Sobieski who was married to the French Marie Casimire d'Arquien). Compendium ferculorum, written in Polish and promoting traditional domestic cuisine, which maintained a largely medieval outlook, may be seen as Czerniecki's response to the onslaught of culinary cosmopolitanism.

== Content ==
=== Title and dedication ===
Although the book is written entirely in Polish, it has a bilingual, Latin and Polish, title. Compendium ferculorum and zebranie potraw both mean "a collection of dishes", in Latin and Polish, respectively; these are joined by the Polish conjunction albo, "or".

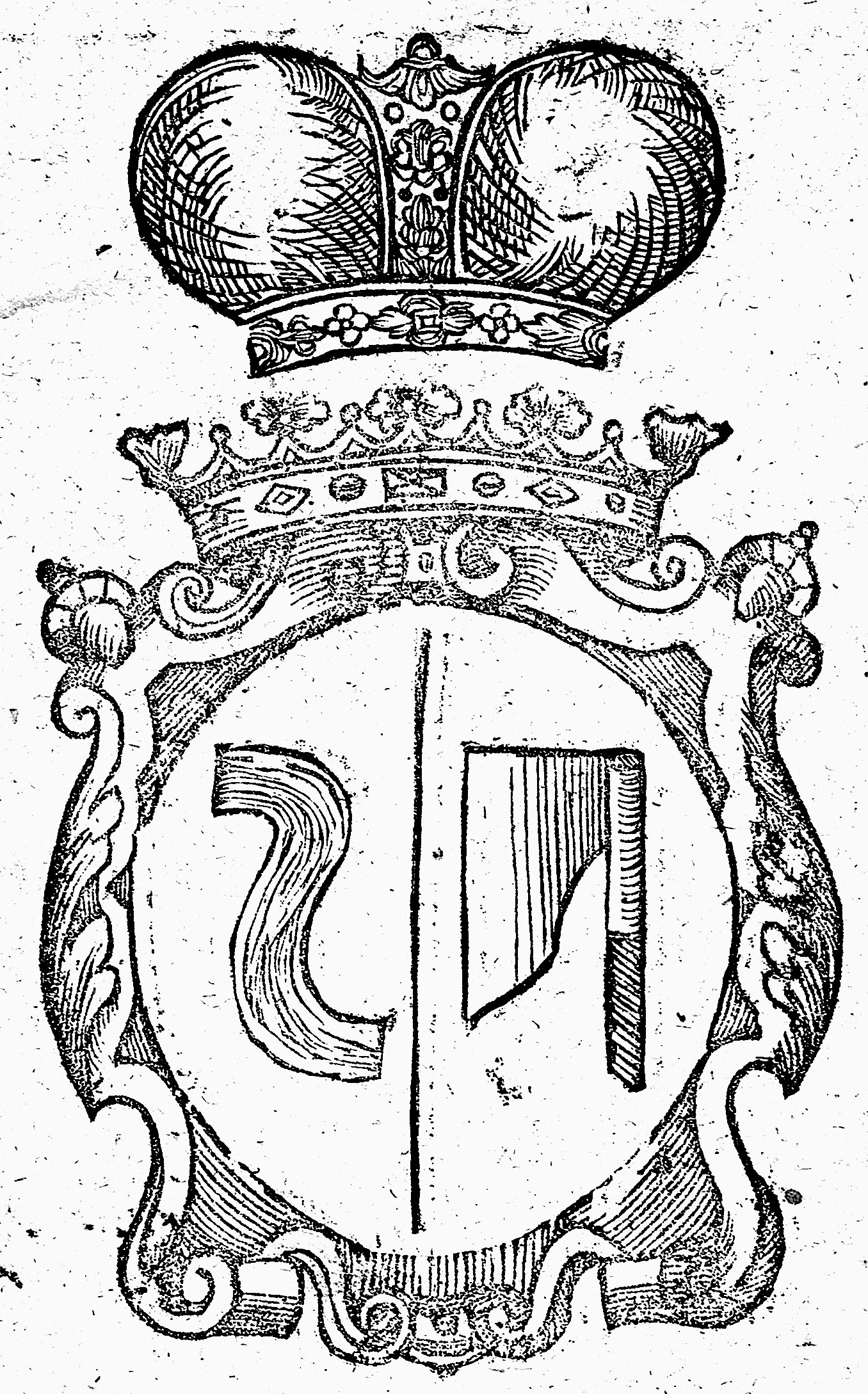
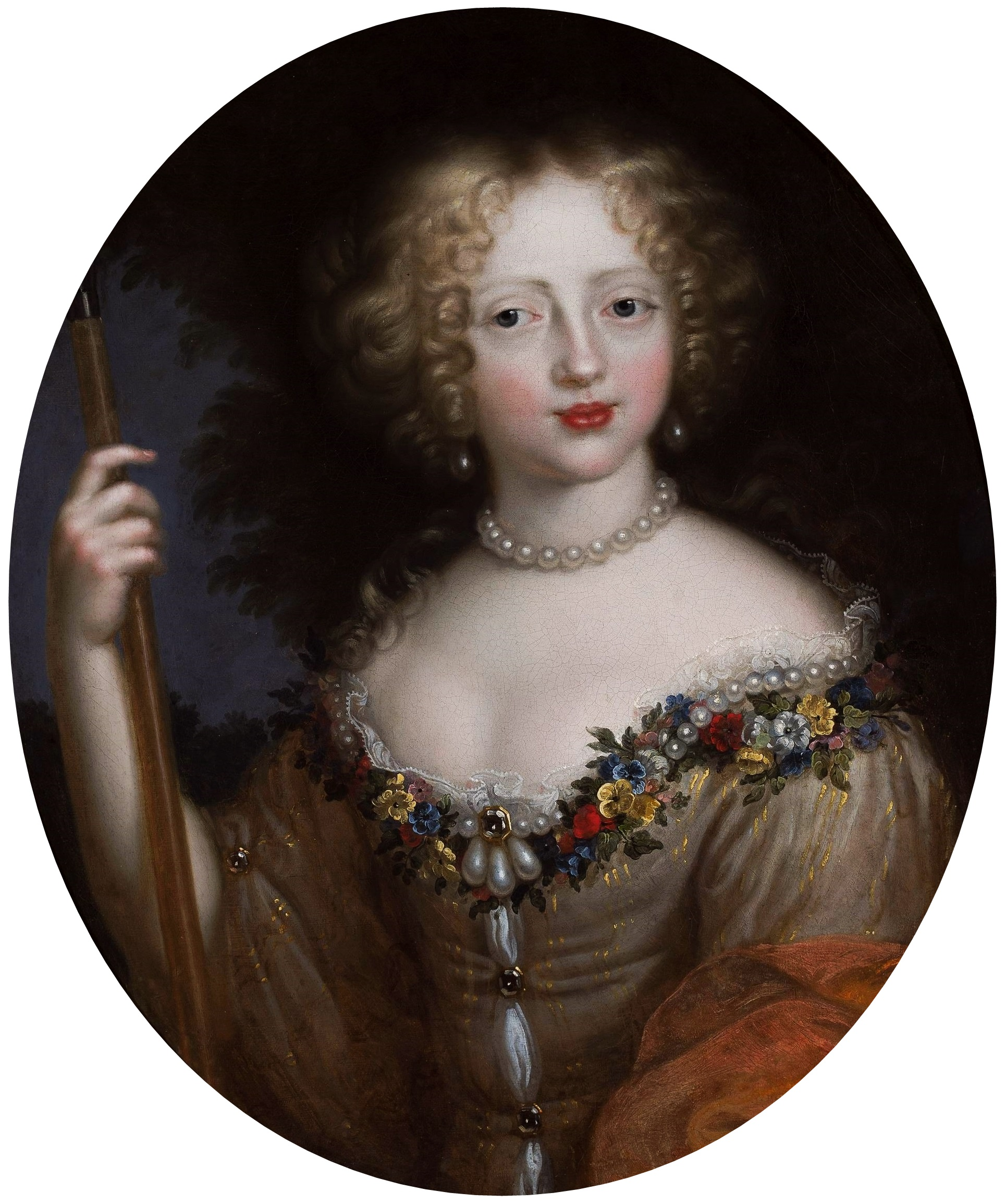
Left: marshalled coats of arms of Szreniawa (river) and Topór (axe), the heraldic clans of the Lubomirski and Ossoliński families, respectively. From the page, in the first edition, facing Czerniecki's dedication of Compendium ferculorum to Princess Helena Tekla Lubomirska née Ossolińska.
Right: Helena Tekla Lubomirska as Flora, painted by Nicolas Mignard (1660s).

The work opens with Czerniecki's dedication to his "most charitable lady and benefactress", (Note: Polish: Pani i Dobrodziejce swojej Wielce M[iłoś]ciwej.) Princess Helena Tekla Lubomirska née Ossolińska, recalling a famed banquet given to Pope Urban VIII by her father, Prince Jerzy Ossoliński, during his diplomatic mission to Rome in 1633. Ossoliński's legation was famous for its ostentatious sumptuousness designed to show off the grandeur and prosperity of the Polish–Lithuanian Commonwealth, even to the point of deliberately fitting his mount with loose golden horseshoes, only to lose them while ceremoniously entering the Eternal City. The dedication, in which Czerniecki pointed out he had already served the house of Lubomirski for 32 years, also mentions Lubomirska's husband, Michał Aleksander Lubomirski, and their son, Józef Karol Lubomirski, wishing the whole family good health and good fortune.

The author was well aware that his was the first cookbook in the Polish vernacular, which he made clear in the dedication. "As no one before me has yet wished to present to the world such useful knowledge in our Polish language," he wrote in his opening line, "I have dared, ... despite my ineptitude, to offer the Polish world my compendium ferculorum, or collection of dishes." (Note: Polish: Iż jeszcze dotąd naszym językiem polskim tak potrzebnej rzeczy żaden przede mną nie chciał pokazać światu, odważyłem się ja, abym ... przy nieudolności mojej uczyniwszy Compendium ferculorum abo zebranie potraw, polskiemu prezentował światu.) Polish bibliographer Karol Estreicher maintained that Compendium ferculorum was preceded by Kuchmistrzostwo (Cooking Mastery), a 16th-century Polish translation of the Czech cookbook Kuchařství (Cookery) written by Bavor Rodovský in 1535. However, no copies of this supposed translation have survived, except for facsimiles of two folios, published in 1891, of uncertain authenticity. Whatever the case, Czerniecki's work is without a doubt the oldest known cookbook published originally in Polish.

=== Inventory ===
The dedication is followed by a detailed inventory of food items, kitchenware, as well as kitchen and waiting staff, necessary for hosting a banquet. The list of food items begins with meats of farm animals and game, including sundry game birds, from snow bunting to great bustard. Different kinds of cereals and pasta are followed by an enumeration of fruits and mushrooms which may be either fresh or dried. The list of vegetables includes, now largely forgotten, cardoon, Jerusalem artichoke and turnip-rooted chervil, or popie jajka (literally, "priest's balls"), as Czerniecki calls it. Under the heading of "spices" come not only saffron, black pepper, ginger, cinnamon, cloves, nutmeg, mace and cumin, all of which were used abundantly in Czerniecki's cookery, but also powdered sugar, rice, "large" and "small" raisins, citrus fruits such as lemons, limes and oranges, and even smoked ham and smoked beef tongue, which were also used as seasonings.

=== Advice ===
Next, the author presents his views and advice regarding the role of kuchmistrz, or "master chef". Czerniecki clearly took pride from his role as a chef, which he understood as incorporating those of an artist and a mentor to younger cooks. According to him, a good chef should be "well-groomed, sober, attentive, loyal and, most of all, supportive to his lord and quick." (Note: Polish: ochędożony, trzeźwy, czujny, wierny, a nade wszystko panu swemu życzliwy i prędki.)

He should be neat and tidy, with a good head of hair, well-combed, short at the back and sides; he should have clean hands, his fingernails should be trimmed, he should wear a white apron; he should not be quarrelsome, he should be sober, submissive, brisk; he should have a good understanding of flavor, a sound knowledge of ingredients and utensils, together with a willingness to serve everyone.

Czerniecki concludes these introductory remarks with an admonition against sprinkling food with bread crumbs and by avowing to focus on "Old Polish dishes" (Note: Polish: staropolskich potraw.) to let the reader experience domestic cuisine before moving on to foreign specialties.

=== Structure ===
The main part of the book follows a well-thought-out structure. It is divided into three chapters, each containing one hundred numbered recipes, followed by an appendix (additament) of ten additional numbered recipes and an extra special recipe called a "master chef's secret" (sekret kuchmistrzowski). Thus, ostensibly, each chapter consists of 111 recipes, giving a total of 333. The first chapter, opening with a recipe for "Polish broth" (rosół polski), is devoted to meat dishes. The second contains recipes for fish dishes, including one for beaver tail, which was considered a fish for the purposes of Catholic dietary law. The final chapter is more diverse and presents recipes for dairy dishes, pies, tarts and cakes, as well as soups (omitted from the chapter's title).

Structure of Compendium ferculorum
	Chapter 1	Chapter 2	Chapter 3
Opening	16 kinds of broth (listed without recipes and not included in the total count)	5 recipes for thick sauces for fish dishes (not included in the total count)	
Main body	100 recipes for meat dishes	100 recipes for fish dishes	100 recipes for dairy dishes, pies, tarts and cakes
Appendix	10 recipes for French potages and cold starters; 10 recipes for condiments to roast meat (not included in the total count)	10 recipes for fish marinades, escargots, turtles, oysters and truffles	10 recipes for charcuterie, smoked fish and mustard
Master chef's secret	Whole capon in a bottle	Whole pike that is partly fried, partly boiled and partly baked	Broth with pearls and a gold coin for convalescents
Total count (ostensibly)	100 + 10 + 1	100 + 10 + 1	100 + 10 + 1
Total count (ostensibly)	333		

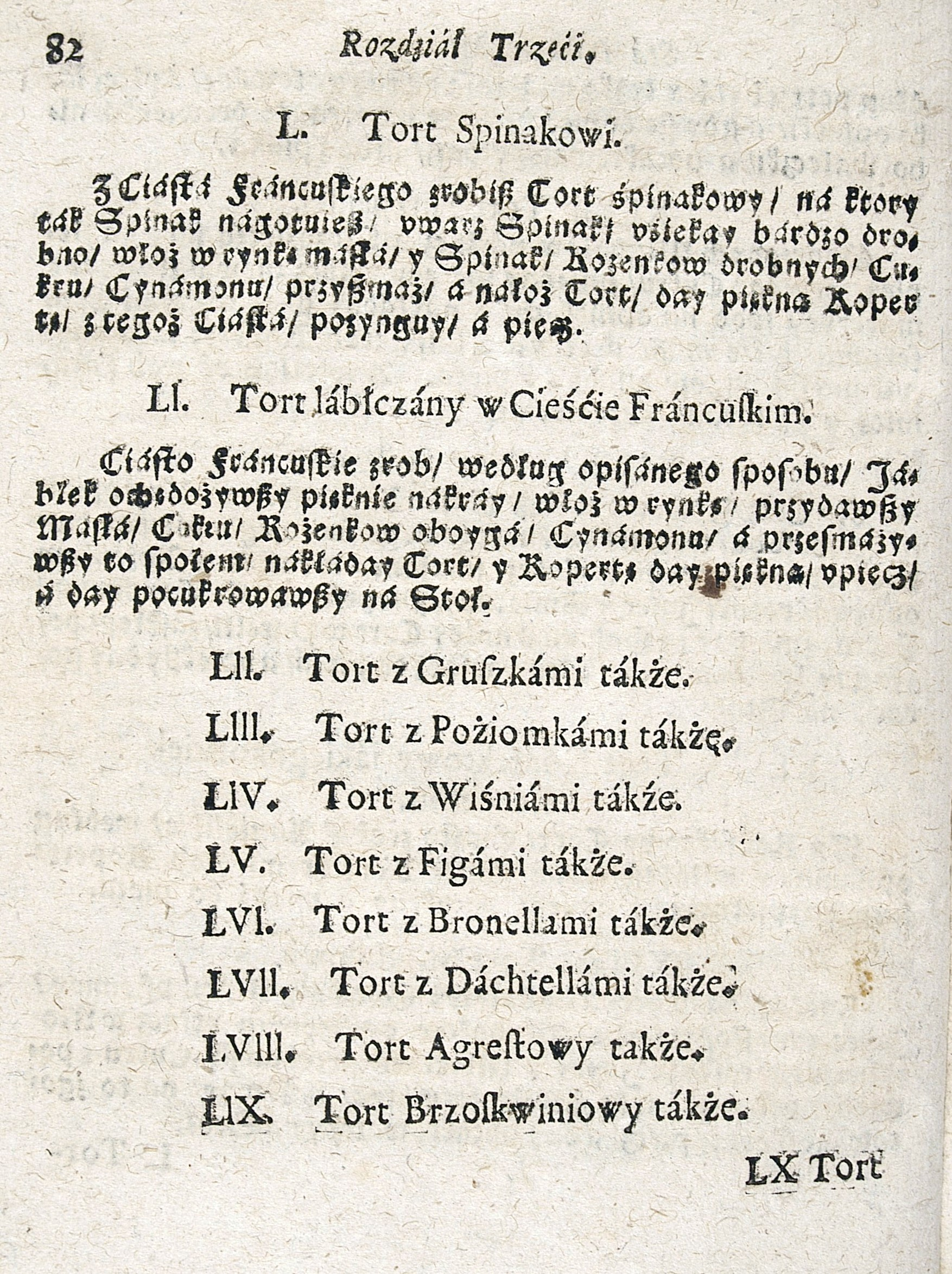
Page 82 of the 1682 edition. Recipe no. 51 (LI), for an apple tart, is followed by several numbered headings hinting at other possible tart fillings, but without any actual recipes.

The actual number of recipes deviates from that claimed by the author. On the one hand, there may be more than one recipe under a single numbered heading. For example, under number 4 in chapter 1, there are three disparate recipes, one for stewed meat in saffron sauce, one for a thick sauce of sieved vegetables and one for boiled meatballs, as well as a tip to add raisins only to those dishes that are meant to be sweet. Chapter 2 opens with five unnumbered recipes for sauces to be used with fish. On the other hand, some of the numbered headings are not followed by any actual recipe, serving only to reiterate that various dishes may be prepared using the same basic technique. For instance, in chapter 3, the recipe for a puff-pastry apple tart, is followed by eleven numbered headings saying, "pear tart likewise", "woodland strawberry tart likewise", "sour cherry tart likewise", and so on for fig, prune, date, gooseberry, peach, plum, currant and quince tarts.

== Approach ==
=== Writing ===
The instructions in Compendium ferculorum are succinct and often vague, lacking such elements of modern culinary recipes as lists of ingredients used, measurements or proportions, and cooking times. The underlying assumption is that they are to be used by a professional chef rather than a person with little cooking experience. The recipe for stewed meat in saffron sauce, cited below, is typical is this regard.

Take a hazel grouse or a partridge, small birds or pigeons, a capon or veal, or whatever [kind of meat] you want, soak in water, put in a pot, salt, bring to boil, debone, cover again with the stock, add parsley. And when boiling, add thick sauce, vinegar, sugar, saffron, pepper, cinnamon, both kinds of raisins, limes. Bring to boil and serve in a bowl. (Note: Polish: Weźmij jarząbka albo kuropatwę, ptaszki albo gołębie, kapłona albo cielęcinę, albo co chcesz, wymocz, spuść w garniec, zasól, odwarz, odbierz, nacedź znowu tym rosołem i pietruszki włóż. A gdy dowiera, wlej gąszczu, octu, słodkości, szafranu, pieprzu, cynamonu, rożenków obojga, limonij. Przywarz, a daj na misę.)

All recipes are written in the second-person singular imperative, a grammatical form that would not have been used to address a person of high rank. The instructions were most likely meant to be read aloud by the chef or one of senior cooks to junior members of the kitchen staff, who would carry them out. This style contrasts with the less direct, impersonal way of addressing the reader, characterized by infinitive verb forms, used in 19th-century Polish cookbooks.

=== Cooking ===
Czerniecki's cooking style, as presented in his book, is characterized by aristocratic lavishness, Baroque pageantry and fiery combinations of contrasting flavours. When it comes to spending, the author cautions against both waste and unnecessary thrift.

According to an old proverb, it is better to incur a thaler's worth of loss than half a penny's worth of embarrassment; a skilled chef should remember this, not to disgrace his lord with foolish parsimony. (Note: Polish: Według starej przypowieści, lepiej mieć za taler szkody, niżeli za pół grosza wstydu, na to umiejętny kuchmistrz pamiętać powinien, żeby głupim skępstwem panu swemu wstydu nie uczynił.)

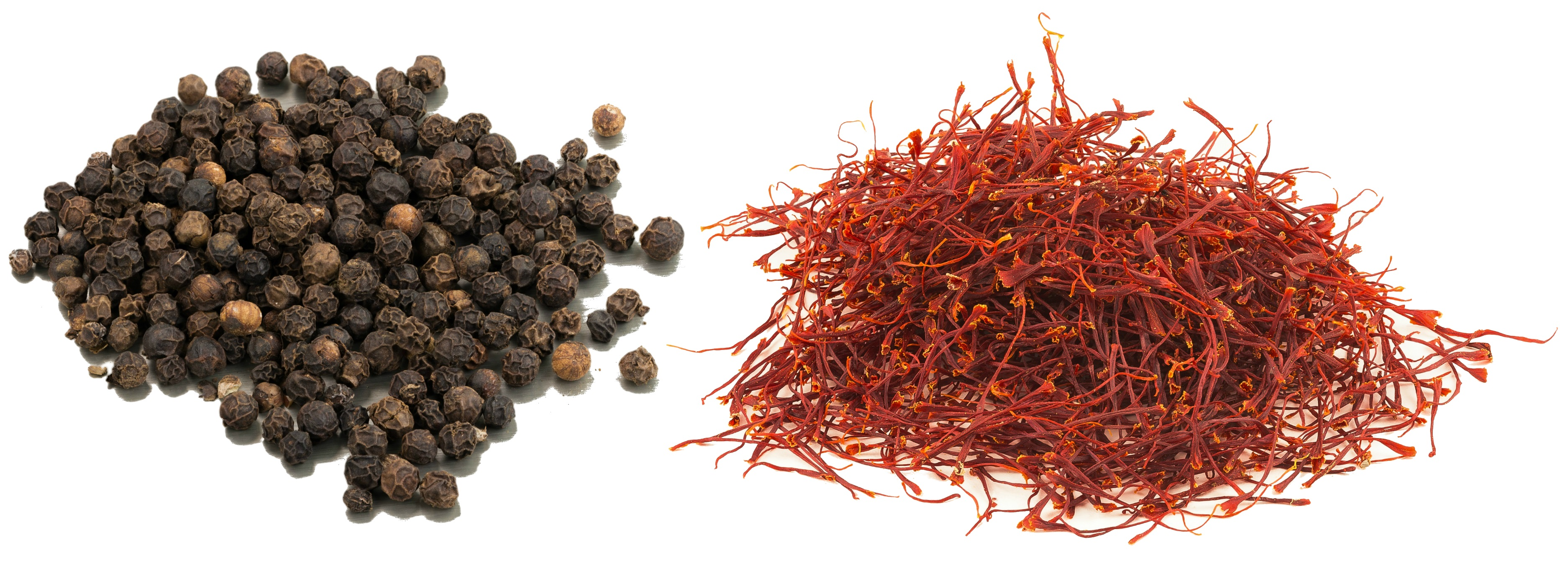
Black peppercorns (left) and saffron threads. Czerniecki described Polish dishes as "saffrony and peppery".

A banquet was meant to overwhelm the guests with lavishness and flaunt the host's wealth and munificence. Abundant use of expensive spices was one way to accomplish this. Black pepper, ginger, saffron, cinnamon, cloves, mace and nutmeg were added to most dishes by kilograms. Czerniecki counted sugar among spices and used it as such; his book contains few recipes for desserts, but sugar is used profusely in recipes for meat, fish and egg dishes. Vinegar was also used in copious amounts. Such fusion of excessively piquant, sweet and sour tastes, which modern Poles would likely find inedible, was typical of Old Polish cuisine, described by Czerniecki as "saffrony and peppery". (Note: Polish: szafrannemi, pieprznemi.)

A dish that succeeded to puzzle or surprise the diners was considered the greatest achievement of culinary sophistication. The "secrets", divulged at the end of each chapter, provide examples of such recipes. One is for a capon in a bottle; the trick was to skin the bird, place the skin inside a bottle, fill it with a mixture of milk and eggs, and put the bottle into boiling water. As the mixture expanded in heat, it produced an illusion of a whole capon fit inside a bottle. Another "secret" is a recipe for an uncut pike with its head fried, its tail baked and its middle boiled; it was made by spit-roasting the fish while basting its head with oil or butter and sprinkling it with flour, and pouring salted vinegar on cloth wrapped around the middle part. The last recipe is for a broth boiled with a string of pearls and a golden coin, which was supposed to cure the sick and those "despairing about their health". (Note: Polish: już o zdrowiu desperujących.)

Czerniecki's goal was to present what he called "Old Polish dishes" as opposed to foreign recipes. He did, however, reference foreign influences throughout the book, particularly from French cuisine and from what he referred to as "Imperial cuisine", that is, the cooking styles of Bohemia and Hungary, then both part of the Habsburg Empire. He displays an ambivalent attitude to French cookery; on the one hand, he dismisses French potages, or creamy soups, as alien to Polish culture and criticizes the use of wine in cooking. "Every dish may be cooked without wine", he wrote, "it suffices to season it with vinegar and sweetness." (Note: Polish: może być każda potrawa bez wina nagotowana, tylko wygodzić octem a słodkością.) On the other hand, Czerniecki does provide recipes for potages, dishes seasoned with wine, as well as other French culinary novelties, such as puff pastry (still known today in Poland as "French dough" (Note: Polish: ciasto francuskie.)), arguing that a skilled chef must be able to accommodate foreign visitors with dishes from their own cuisines. In fact, the author included more French recipes than he was ready to admit; even the "secret" recipe for a capon in a bottle was adapted from a similar recipe found in Le cuisinier françois.

== Legacy ==
=== Culinary ===
For over a century after its first edition, Compendium ferculorum remained the only printed cookbook in Polish. It was only in 1783 that a new Polish-language cookbook – Kucharz doskonały (The Perfect [male] Cook) by Wojciech Wielądko – was published. Its first edition was little more than an abridged translation of La cuisinière bourgeoise (The Urban [female] Cook) by Menon, a popular French cookbook, first published in 1746. One part of Kucharz doskonały, however, was based directly on Czerniecki's work. Wielądko chose not to translate the glossary of culinary terms included in Menon's book; instead, he appended to the cookbook his own glossary, which explained the culinary terms (and, in some cases, quoted entire recipes) found in Compendium ferculorum. This way, Kucharz doskonały combined French cuisine, which was then storming into fashion in Poland, with Old Polish cookery, exemplified by Czerniecki's book. In the third edition, in 1800, Wielądko included even more time-honoured Polish and German recipes, creating an amalgam of national culinary tradition and new French cuisine, and thus laying the groundwork for modern Polish cookery.

=== Literary ===
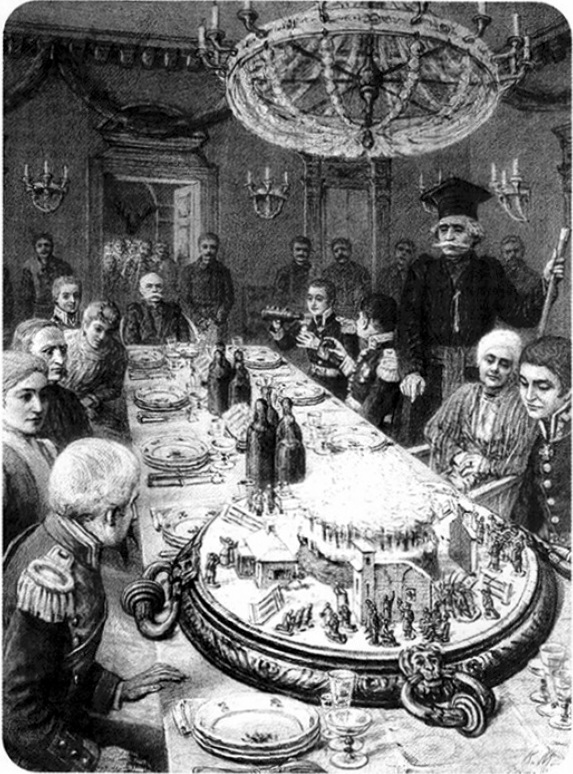
Kazimierz Mrówczyński, The Centrepiece Masterpiece of Soplicowo – illustration to Book 12 of Pan Tadeusz (1898)

In 1834, Compendium ferculorum served as an inspiration to Adam Mickiewicz for his nostalgic description of "the last Old Polish feast" in Pan Tadeusz, a mock heroic poem set in the years 1811–1812, which has come to be revered as the Polish national epic. In his account of the fictional banquet in Book 12, the poet included the names of several dishes found in the oldest Polish cookbook, such as "royal borscht", as well as two of the master chef's secrets: the broth with pearls and a coin, and the three-way fish.

Here the Tribune, quite done, with his staff gave a sign,
And the house-servants entered in pairs, in good line,
And began serving: barszcz soup, called "royal", to start,
Or the old-Polish clear broth, prepared with great art,
Into which, by a secret old recipe, threw
The Tribune a gold coin and of pearls not a few.
(Such a broth the blood purges, improving one's health),
Followed by other dishes, but who can them tell!
Who now comprehends all these, to our times quite strange,
These huge platters of kontuz, of arkas, blancmange,
And then cod with its odorous and rich stuffing comes,
With musk, caramel, civet, pine nuts, damson plums;
And those fish! Great smoked salmon from Danube afar,
Caspian sturgeon, Venetian and Turkish caviar,
Pike and cousin luce, each one a full cubit long,
The flounder and mature carp, carp "royal" and young!
Last, a master-chef's tour de force comes into view:
A fish uncut, with head fried, its middle baked through,
At its tail end and swimming in sauce, a ragout.

— Adam Mickiewicz (translated by Marcel Weyland),
Pan Tadeusz (Book Twelve, Love and Friendship!)

To underscore that the feast represents an exotic bygone world of pre-partition Poland, Mickiewicz added to this a list of random dishes, ingredients and additives, whose names he found in Compendium ferculorum and which had already been forgotten in his own time: kontuza (soup of boiled and sieved meat), arkas (sweet milk-based jelly), blemas (blancmange), pomuchla (Atlantic cod), figatele (meatballs), cybeta (civet), piżmo (musk), dragant (tragacanth), pinele (pine nuts) and brunele (prunes). This is followed by a similar enumeration of various kinds of fish, whose names are likewise taken from the inventory at the beginning of Czerniecki's book. A description of a white-apron-clad chef and a reference to Prince Ossoliński's banquet in Rome, both found in Book 11, are also clearly inspired by Czerniecki's characterization of a master chef and his dedication, respectively.

What is intriguing about this literary link between the oldest Polish cookbook and the national epic is that Mickiewicz apparently confused the title of Czerniecki's work with that of Wielądko's Kucharz doskonały, both in the poem itself and in the poet's explanatory notes. Whether this is a result of the author's mistake or poetic license, remains a matter of scholarly dispute. According to the poet's friend, Antoni Edward Odyniec, Mickiewicz never parted with an "old and torn book" (Note: Polish: starej obdartej książki.) entitled Doskonały kucharz, which he carried in his personal traveling library. Stanisław Pigoń, a historian of Polish literature, has suggested that it was actually a copy of Czerniecki's book, which happened to be missing its title page, so Mickiewicz was familiar with the contents of Compendium ferculorum, but not with its title, and confounded it with Wielądko's cookbook.

== Publishing history ==
The original edition of 1682 was the only publication of Czerniecki's cookbook during his lifetime. After his death, however, Compendium ferculorum was republished about 20 times until 1821. Some of the later editions were published under new titles, reflecting a broadening of the target readership.

The second edition, published in 1730, was very similar to the first, with only minor revisions. Both editions were printed in blackletter type and in quarto book format; later editions were printed in roman type and in octavo.

The third edition, published in Wilno (now Vilnius, Lithuania) in 1744, was the first to be printed outside Kraków. It was also the first edition to be given a new title, Stół obojętny, to jest pański, a oraz i chudopacholski (The Indifferent Table, that is, Both Lordly and Common). The Sandomierz edition of 1784, under the latter title, was expanded with forty new recipes for sauces, gingerbread, vinegar and other condiments. This addition, copied from Compendium medicum, a popular 18th-century Polish medical reference book, differed in both writing and cooking style from Czerniecki's original work, and did not reappear in subsequent editions.

Editions from the first quarter of the 19th century, published in Warsaw and Berdyczów (now Berdychiv, Ukraine) use yet another title, Kucharka miejska i wiejska (The Urban and Rural [female] Cook). These changes in title indicate that the cooking style promoted by the Lubomirskis' head chef, originally associated with fine dining at a magnate court, eventually became part of the culinary repertoire of housewives in towns and countryside throughout Poland.

Renewed popular interest in Old Polish cuisine has resulted in reprints being made since the turn of the 21st century, including a limited bibliophile edition of 500 numbered leather-bound volumes published in 2002 in Jędrzejów. In 2009, the Wilanów Palace Museum in Warsaw published a critical edition with a broad introduction by food historian Jarosław Dumanowski presenting Czerniecki's life and work.

=== List of editions ===
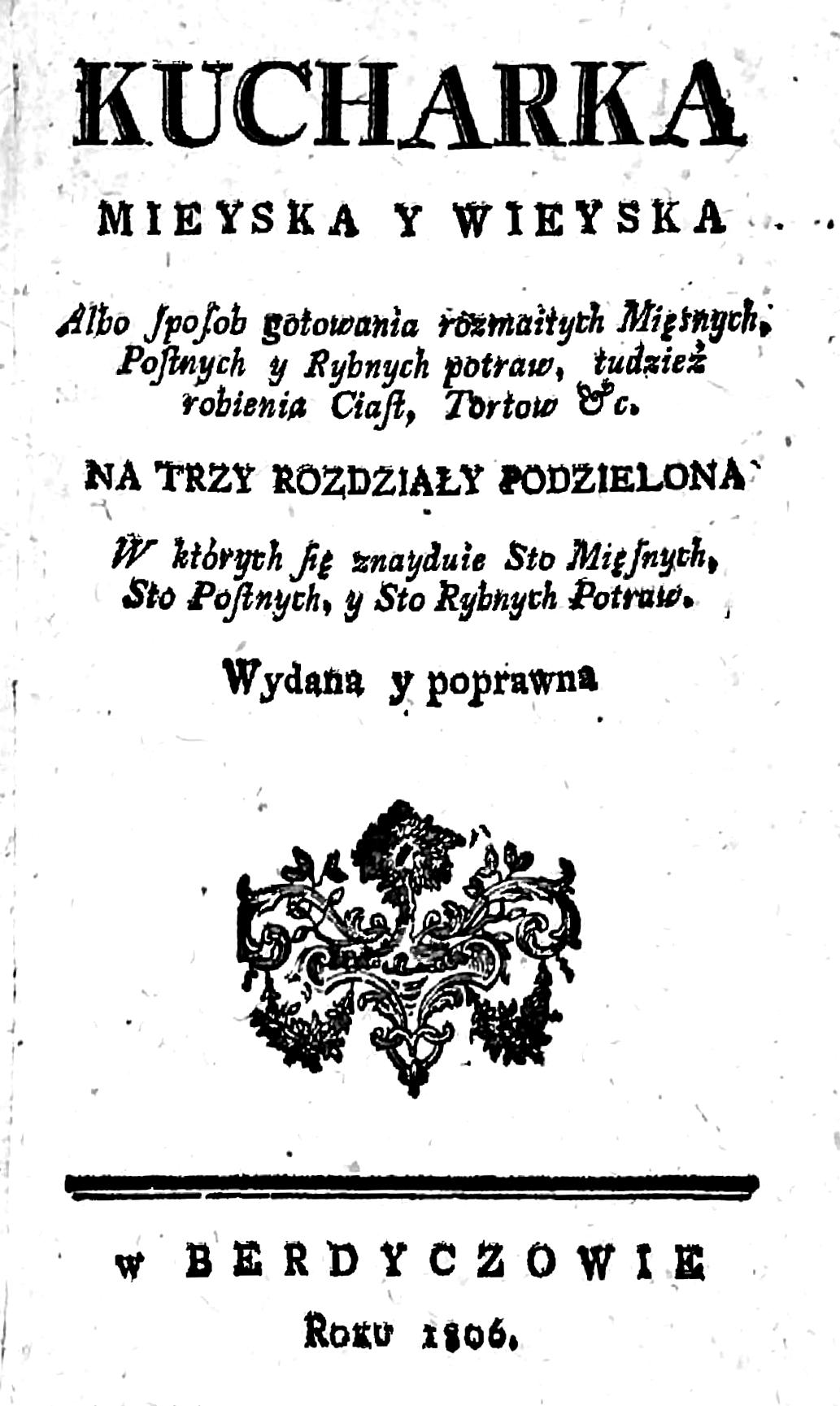
Title page of the 1806 edition of Czerniecki's cookbook under the new title Kucharka miejska i wiejska

- Czerniecki, Stanisław (1682). Compendivm fercvlorum, albo zebranie potraw, przez vrodzonego Stanisława Czernieckiego J.K.M. Sekretarza, A Jaśnie Wielmożnego Jego Mości Pana Alexandra Michała Hrabie na Wiśniczu y Jarosławiu Lvbomirskiego, Woiewody Krakowskiego, Sandomirskiego, Zatorskiego, Niepołomskiego, Lubaczewskiego, Ryckiego &c. &c. Starosty Kuchmistrza Ad vsum publicum napisane [Compendium Ferculorum, or A Collection of Dishes, written for public use by the Noble Stanisław Czerniecki, Secretary to His Royal Majesty and Head Chef to the Right Honourable Aleksander Michał Lubomirski, Count of Wiśnicz and Jarosław, Voivode of Kraków, Captain of Sandomierz, Zator, Niepołomice, Lubaczów, Ryki, etc., etc.]. Kraków: Drukarnia Jerzego i Mikołaja Schedlów.
- —— (1730). Compendivm fercvlorum... Kraków: Drukarnia Jakuba Matyaszkiewicza.
- —— (1744). Stół obojętny, to iest, pański, a oraz y chudopacholski, abo sposób gotowania rozmaitych potraw według smaku y upodobania, tak względem bogatych, iako też ubogich traktamentów... [The Indifferent Table, that is, Both Lordly and Common, or A Method of Cooking Various Dishes According to Taste and Liking, for Rich, as well as Poor, Banquets]. Wilno: Drukarnia Akademicka. (2nd ed. 1775, 3rd ed. 1782, 4th ed. 1788)
- —— (1753). Compendivm fercvlorum... Kraków: Drukarnia Sebastyana Hebanowskiego. OCLC 890387839.
- —— (1755). Compendivm fercvlorum... Lwów. (2nd ed. 1757, OCLC 82733508)
- —— (1784). Stół obojętny... Sandomierz: Drukarnia J.K.Mci y Rzeczypospolitej. Enlarged with 40 additional recipes.
- —— (1800). Kucharka mieyska y wieyska Albo sposób gotowania rozmaitych Mięsnych, Postnych y Rybnych potraw, tudzież robienia Ciast, Tortów &c. na trzy rodziały podzielona, W których się znayduie Sto Mięsnych, Sto Postnych, y Sto Rybnych Potraw [The Urban and Rural Cook, or A Method of Cooking Various Meat, Fasting and Fish Dishes, as well as Making Cakes, Tarts, etc., divided into three chapters, which contain one hundred each of meat, fasting and fish dishes]. Warszawa. (2nd ed. 1804, 3rd ed. 1806 in Berdyczów, 4th ed. 1811, 5th ed. 1816, 6th ed. 1821)
- —— (1999). Walecki, Wacław; Winczura, Łukasz (eds.). Compendium ferculorum albo Zebranie potraw. Biblioteka Tradycji Literackich. Vol. 24. Kraków: Collegium Columbinum. ISBN 978-83-87553-13-5. OCLC 169660504. (2nd ed. 2004)
- —— (1999). Chodkiewicz-Przypkowska, Elżbieta (ed.). Compendium ferculorum... Jędrzejów: Poligrafia. ISBN 978-83-91041-32-1. OCLC 749605653. Limited bibliophile edition.
- —— (2009). Dumanowski, Jarosław; Spychaj, Magdalena (eds.). Compendium ferculorum albo Zebranie potraw. Monumenta Poloniae Culinaria. Vol. 1. Foreword by Stanisław Lubomirski. Warszawa: Muzeum Pałac w Wilanowie. ISBN 978-83-60959-01-5. OCLC 750691466. (2nd ed. 2010, 3rd ed. 2012)
- —— (2012). Compendium ferculorum albo Zebranie potraw. Warszawa: Graf_ika. ISBN 978-83-61889-69-4. OCLC 947746586. Photo-offset reprint of the 1682 edition.
- —— (2014). Dumanowski, Jarosław; Spychaj, Magdalena (eds.). Compendium ferculorum or Collection of Dishes. Translated by Czuchra, Agnieszka; Czuchra, Maciej. Warszawa: Muzeum Pałac w Wilanowie. ISBN 978-83-63580-40-7.
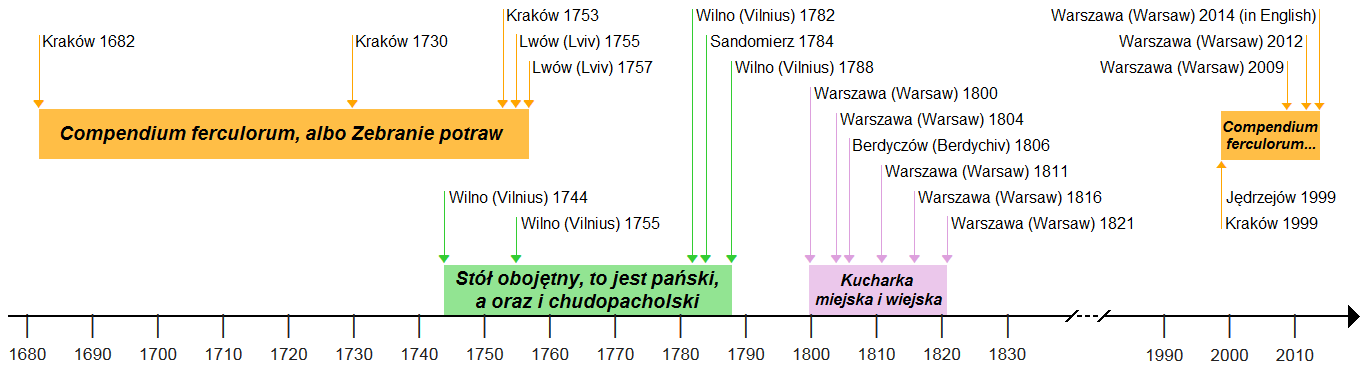
Timeline of Compendium ferculorum editions under various titles

=== Translations ===
In the late 17th century, Compendium ferculorum was anonymously translated into Russian as Povarennaya kniga (Cookery Book). This translation was never published and is only known from a manuscript held at the Russian State Library in Moscow (another manuscript Russian translation of Czerniecki's work is possibly held at the National Library of Russia in Saint Petersburg). In 2014, an English version of the Wilanów edition was published; the publication of a French translation is also planned.

== Sources ==
- Bąbel, Agnieszka M. (2000a). "Garnek i księga – związki tekstu kulinarnego z tekstem literackim w literaturze polskiej XIX wieku" [The pot and the book: relationships between culinary and literary texts in Polish literature of the 19th century] (PDF). Teksty Drugie: Teoria Literatury, Krytyka, Interpretacja (in Polish). 6. Warszawa: Instytut Badań Literackich Polskiej Akademii Nauk: 163–181. ISSN 0867-0633.
- —— (2000b). "Przemiany formy tekstu kulinarnego (III–XIX w.)" [Evolution of culinary text forms in the 3rd–19th centuries] (PDF). Napis (in Polish). VI. Warszawa: Wydawnictwo Instytutu Badań Literackich PAN: 215–230. doi:10.18318/napis.2000.1.11. ISSN 1507-4153. S2CID 194148438. Archived from the original (PDF) on 2017-08-08.
- Barłowska, Maria (2015). "Jerzy Ossoliński's legacy to Rome in 1633". Silva Rerum. Warszawa: Muzeum Pałacu Króla Jana III w Wilanowie.
- Czerniecki, Stanisław (2012). Dumanowski, Jarosław; Spychaj, Magdalena (eds.). Compendium ferculorum albo Zebranie potraw (in Polish). Warszawa: Muzeum Pałac w Wilanowie. ISBN 978-83-60959-01-5.
- Dumanowski, Jarosław (2012). Compendium ferculorum Stanisława Czernieckiego, in Czerniecki (2012, pp. 13–70).
- —— (2013). Tatarskie ziele w cukrze, czyli Staropolskie słodycze [Calamus in Sugar, or Old Polish Sweets] (in Polish). Warszawa: Muzeum Pałac w Wilanowie. ISBN 978-83-60959-22-0.
- —— (2016). "Rozproszone przepisy kulinarne: Materiał drukowany" [Scattered Culinary Recipes: Printed Material]. In Dumanowski, Jarosław (ed.). Staropolskie przepisy kulinarne: Receptury rozproszone z XVI–XVIII w.: Źródła drukowane [Old Polish Culinary Recipes: Scattered Recipes from the 16th–18th Centuries: Printed Sources] (in Polish). Warszawa: Muzeum Pałacu Króla Jana III w Wilanowie. pp. 9–51. ISBN 978-83-63580-71-1.
- Estreicher, Karol (1896). Bibliografia polska [Polish Bibliography] (in Polish). Vol. XIV. Kraków: Drukarnia Uniwersytetu Jagiellońskiego.
- Kuras, Katarzyna (2016). "Czy Le cuisinier françois zmienił polską kuchnię w czasach nowożytnych? Przyczynek do zagadnienia transferu kulinarnych wzorców" [Did Le cuisinier françois change the Polish cuisine in the early-modern period? A contribution to the analysis of the transfer of culinary patterns]. Prace Historyczne (in Polish). 143 (3). Kraków: Uniwersytet Jagielloński: 429–448. doi:10.4467/20844069PH.16.020.5217. ISSN 0083-4351.
- "Książki wydane przez Muzeum Pałacu Króla Jana III od 1995 r." [Books published by King John III's Palace Museum since 1995] (in Polish). Warszawa: Muzeum Pałacu Króla Jana III w Wilanowie. Archived from the original on 2017-03-02.
- Leeming, Henry (1974). "A 17th-Century Polish Cookery Book and Its Russian Manuscript Translation". The Slavonic and East European Review. 52 (129). Modern Humanities Research Association and University College London, School of Slavonic and East European Studies: 500–513. JSTOR 4206944.
- Mickiewicz, Adam (2006) [1834]. "Pan Tadeusz". Translated by Weyland, Marcel. Archived from the original on 2017-02-09.
- Ocieczek, Renarda (2000). "'Zabytek drogi prawych zwyczajów' – o książce kucharskiej, którą czytywał Mickiewicz" ["The Precious Monument of Righteous Customs" – on the cookery book that Mickiewicz used to read]. In Piechota, Marek (ed.). "Pieśni ogromnych dwanaście...": Studia i szkice o Panu Tadeuszu ["Twelve great cantos...": Studies and essays on Pan Tadeusz] (PDF) (in Polish). Katowice: Wydawnictwo Uniwersytetu Śląskiego. pp. 171–191. ISBN 83-226-0598-2. ISSN 0208-6336.
- —— (2006). "O dwu książeczkach Stanisława Czernieckiego, pisarza i kuchmistrza z XVII wieku" [On Two Small Books by Stanisław Czerniecki, a 17th Century Head Cook and Writer] (PDF). Rocznik Biblioteki Narodowej (in Polish). XXXVII–XXXVIII. Warszawa: Biblioteka Narodowa: 133–138. ISBN 83-7009-581-X. ISSN 0083-7261.
- Razcwarkow, Sylwia (2005). "Najnowsze dary i nabytki: Książki" [Recent Donations and Acquisitions: Books] (PDF). Biuletyn Informacyjny Biblioteki Narodowej (in Polish). 3 (174). Warszawa: Wydawnictwo Biblioteki Narodowej: 12–13. ISSN 0006-3983.
