= Foray =

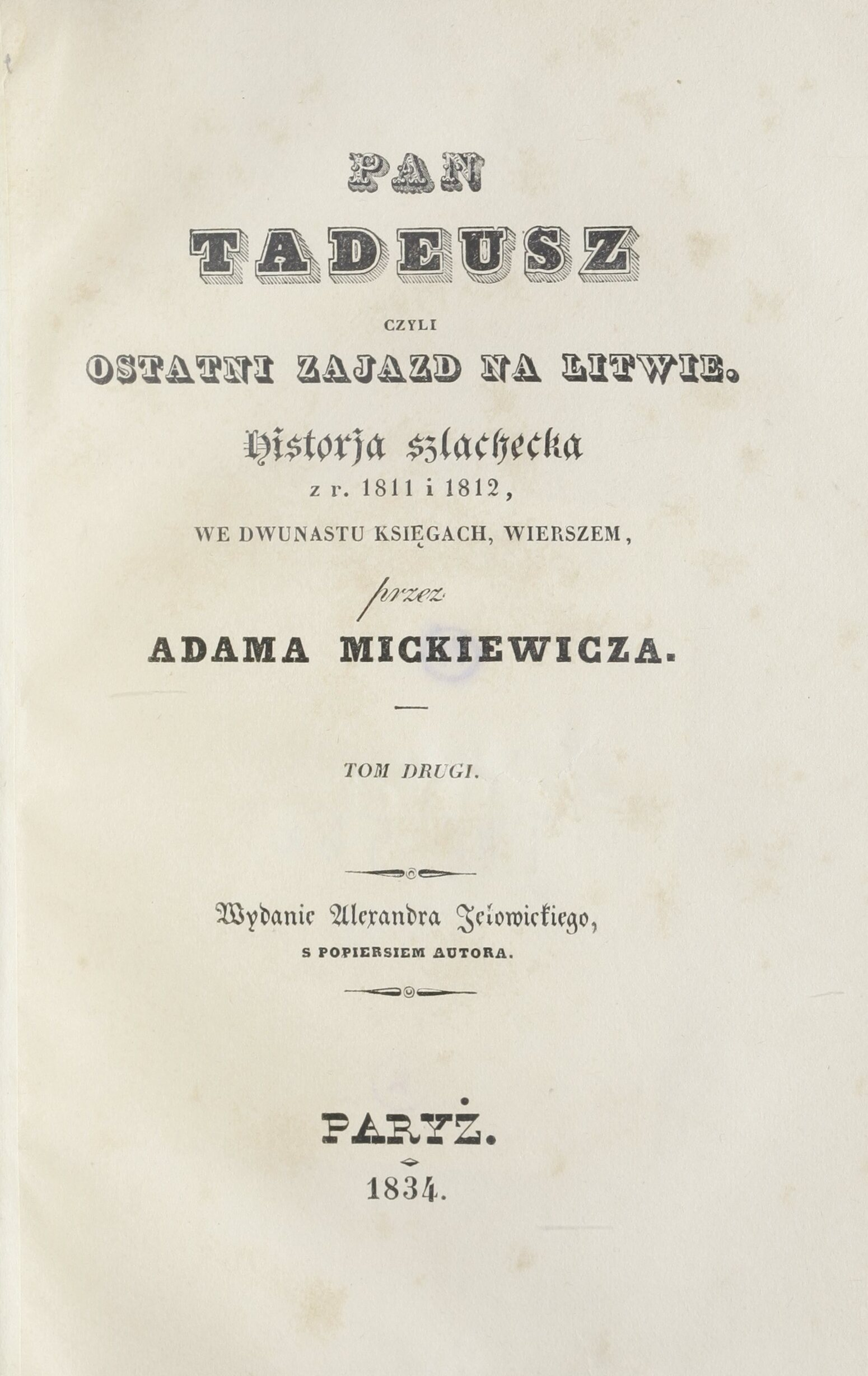
Adam Mickiewicz's Pan Tadeusz immortalized the tradition of forays.

A foray (Polish: zajazd, Belarusian: наезд, romanized: nayezd, Ukrainian: наїзд, romanized: naizd) was a traditional method of law enforcement in Grand Duchy of Lithuania and Polish–Lithuanian Commonwealth. In view of the weakness of the executive in the Polish-Lithuanian Commonwealth, it was used by members of the szlachta to defend their rights.

In legal practice, foray was sanctioned by starosta officials, and was the fourth step in the execution of a legal ruling. After the guilty party refused to abandon the disputed property, starosta would call his supporters as well as opponents of the guilty party (therefore creating a temporary force of militia) and attempt to remove the guilty party from his manor.

Since the mid-17th century, forays were increasingly done without a legal sanction simply when a member of szlachta would gather his supporters and raid an estate of his opponent. They would become a common occurrence during the period of nobles' anarchy in the Commonwealth.

In literature, forays were most famously portrayed in Adam Mickiewicz's Pan Tadeusz, as well as in The Trilogy (With Fire and Sword, The Deluge, Fire in the Steppe) of Henryk Sienkiewicz.
