= Wojciech Wielądko =

Polish historian, poet, playwright, translator, lexicographer and food writer

Wojciech Wincenty Wielądko
- Born: 1744 or 1749; Kiev Voivodeship, Polish–Lithuanian Commonwealth (now in Ukraine)
- Died: 30 November 1822 (aged 72 to 76); Warsaw, Kingdom of Poland
- Occupations: Historian, writer, translator

Wojciech Wincenty Wielądko (Polish pronunciation: [ˈvɔjt͡ɕɛɣ vinˈt͡sɛntɨ vjɛˈlɔntkɔ]; 1744/49–1822) was a Polish historian, poet, playwright, translator, lexicographer and food writer. He is best known for his work on Polish heraldry entitled Heraldyka, czyli opisania familii i krwi związku szlachty polskiej i Wielkiego Księstwa Litewskiego z ich herbami (Heraldry, or Description of the Families and Kinship of the Nobility of Poland and the Grand Duchy of Lithuania with their Coats of Arms), as well as for his translation from French of Menon's cookbook La Cuisinière bourgeoise, first published in 1783 as Kucharz doskonały (The Perfect Cook).

Kucharz doskonały is mentioned in the portrayal of an Old Polish banquet in Pan Tadeusz, the Polish national epic, but it was apparently confused with Compendium ferculorum, another Polish cookbook.
