= Do prostego człowieka =

1929 poem by Julian Tuwim

Do prostego człowieka (English: To the Simple Man) is a poem by Julian Tuwim, first published in the October 27, 1929 edition of Robotnik daily. The poem gained immediate popularity due to its strong pacifist anti-war message; its mockery of militarism, jingoistic fervour and hysteria; and its placement of blame upon those in power who profit by starting wars to be fought by commoners.

The poem was commonly read as expressing the poet's disillusionment with Józef Piłsudski's regime and increasingly militant rhetoric.

At the same time it was openly criticised by both left and right-wing journalists. The rightists went as far as to suggest Tuwim be hanged for allegedly promoting desertion among Polish soldiers. Tuwim was defending himself by saying that his poem is against offensive wars, not defensive ones. Despite criticism, the poem became immediately popular in Poland.

In recent years the poem was translated to English by Marcel Weyland. It also gained new popularity due to numerous rock bands performing it on their concerts. One of the best-known such interpretations is by a Polish rock group Akurat.
