= Kenneth R. Mackenzie =

British scholar

Kenneth R. Mackenzie (1908–1991), British scholar and parliamentary clerk.

He was educated at Dulwich College and New College, Oxford. In 1930, he was appointed Clerk to the House of Commons. He served as Clerk to the Select Committee during the 1945-6 session before being appointed Clerk of Public Bills, a position he held until his retirement. He was the author of The English Parliament, The Houses of Parliament : a guide to the Palace of Westminster , and produced translations of In Switzerland by the Polish Romantic poet Słowacki, and Adam Mickiewicz's epic poem Pan Tadeusz, Dante Alighieri's Divine Comedy, and Virgil's The Georgics.
