= Wola Nieszkowska =

- Village
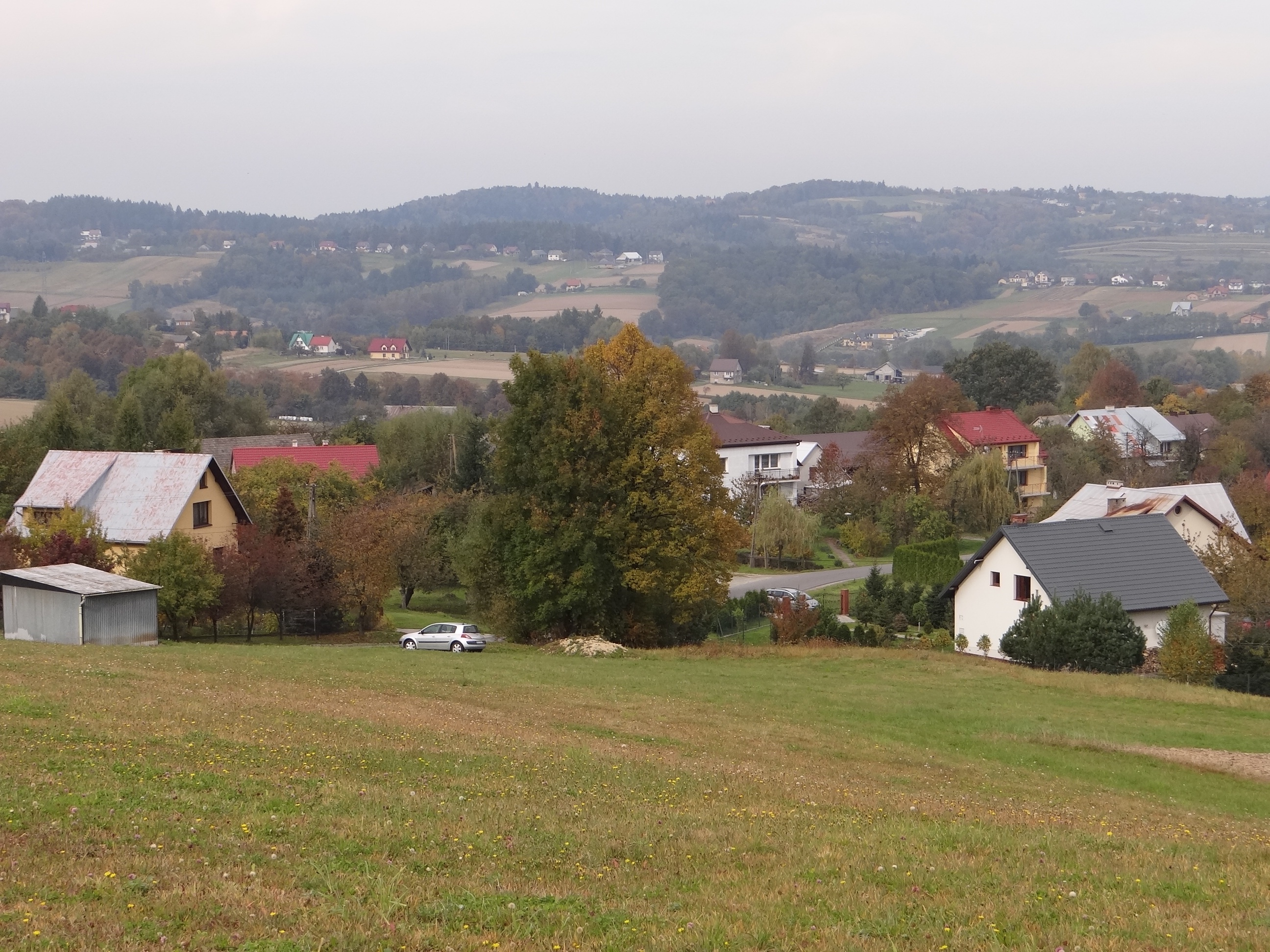
- General view

- Location within Poland
- Coordinates: 49°54′N 20°23′E
- Country: Poland
- Voivodeship: Lesser Poland
- County: Bochnia
- Gmina: Bochnia

Wola Nieszkowska [ˈvɔla ɲɛʂˈkɔfska] is a village in the administrative district of Gmina Bochnia, within Bochnia County, Lesser Poland Voivodeship, in southern Poland.
