= Marcel Weyland =

Australian translator (1927–2025)

Marcel Weyland (13 June 1927 – 18 October 2025) was a Polish-born Australian translator, particularly of Polish poetry. His publications include translations of Adam Mickiewicz's Pan Tadeusz and selected poems of Julian Tuwim, as well as anthologies, including Echoes: Poems of the Holocaust and The Word: 200 Years of Polish Poetry.

== Life and career ==
Weyland was born in Łódź, Poland on 13 June 1927. His family fled ahead of the Germans in September 1939. They originally fled to Lithuania, where they were fortunate to receive a visa from the Dutch acting consul Jan Zwartendijk for Curaçao and a Japanese transit visa from the Japanese diplomat Chiune Sugihara. From here they went through the Soviet Union to Japan, before being interned for the rest of World War II by the Japanese in Shanghai, China. The family finally settled in Sydney, Australia, in 1946. Here he studied architecture and law.

== Works ==
Weyland translated numerous poems from Polish into English, aiming to retain the originals' rhythm and rhyming structure.

In 2005, Verand Press, a subprint of Brandl & Schlesinger, published Pan Tadeusz by Adam Mickiewicz. Weyland began the translation in the 1950s as an attempt to convey a better sense of the original, and was initially intended for his family in Australia. Encouraged to continue it, he completed it in the hope that it would be of value to a wider audience.

In 2007, Echoes: Poems of the Holocaust was published by Brandl & Schlesinger. It is his translation of poems by Polish poets, Jewish and non-Jewish, written during the Holocaust and after, by survivors and witnesses and others.

In August 2010, the same publisher published The Word: 200 Years of Polish Poetry, 2010, ed. Brandl & Schlesinger, Blackheath, NSW, Australia, ISBN 978-1-921556-03-6. It is the first such bilingual anthology ever published.

In 2012 the same publisher published his anthology of the prose and verse of Władysław Leśmian: What I Read to the Dead.

In 2014, the same publisher published Love, Sex and Death in the Poetry of Bolesław Szlengel.

In 2017, the same publisher published Julian Tuwim Selected Poems, Brandl & Schlesinger, Blackheath NSW, ISBN 9780994429780.

In 2020, the same publisher published Amoroso, 50 Polish love poems and 'Furioso', by three angry poets: Mickiewicz, Słowacki and Tuwim.

In 2022, publication was expected of Close to the heart, selected poems of six 20th C. Polish women poets.

Weyland was recognised for his translations. He was awarded the Order of Merit by the Polish government for his contributions to Polish culture in 2005, in 2008 the Medal of the Order of Australia, in 2012 (by the President of Poland) the Officer's Cross of the Order of Merit to the Polish Commonwealth and in 2013 the gold medal Gloria Artis by the Polish Minister of Culture.

== Personal life ==
In 1952, Weyland married artist Philippa Keane. They lived in Mosman, Sydney, Australia and had five children, 21 grandchildren and five great grandchildren. Philippa died in 2018.

Weyland died on 18 October 2025, at the age of 98.

== See also ==
- Do prostego człowieka
