= Denhof coat of arms =

Polish and German coat of arms

Denhof
- Alternative name: Dzik
- Earliest mention: unknown
- Towns: none
- Families: Berens, Bieret, Biront, Denhof, Denhoff, Doenhoff, Donhoff, Dönhoff, Dobszewicz

Denhof is a Polish coat of arms. It was used by several szlachta families in the times of the Polish–Lithuanian Commonwealth. Dönhoff (German) or Denhoff (Polish) (sometimes also Denhof or Doenhoff) was a Livonian German noble family, a branch of which moved to the Polish–Lithuanian Commonwealth in the 16th century and became recognized as a Polish noble (szlachta) there.

== Blazon ==
Argent a boar's head caboshed sable armed of the field. Crest: issuant out of a crest coronet or a demi-boar sable armed argent pierced by two spears saltire-wise points in chief also argent. Mantled sable doubled argent.

== Notable bearers ==
Notable bearers of this coat of arms include:

- Ernst Magnus Dönhoff (1581–1642), voivode of Parnawa (1640–1642)
- Kasper Dönhoff (1587–1645), voivode of Dorpat (1627–1634)
- Alexander von Dönhoff (1683–1742), Prussian Lieutenant-General
- Sophie von Dönhoff (1768–1838), morganatic spouse of Frederick William II of Prussia
- August Heinrich Hermann von Dönhoff (1797–1874), Prussian diplomat
- Marion Dönhoff (1909–2002), a German journalist

== See also ==
- Polish heraldry
- Heraldry

== Sources ==
- Herbarz Polski - Polish Armorial 2009/2010 (Tadeusz Gajl) - Herb Denhof
- Denhoff (herb szlachecki), according to Polish site (June 19, 2011)
- Dönhoff
