= Zofia Sieniawska =

Polish noblewoman (1699–1771)

Zofia Czartoryska
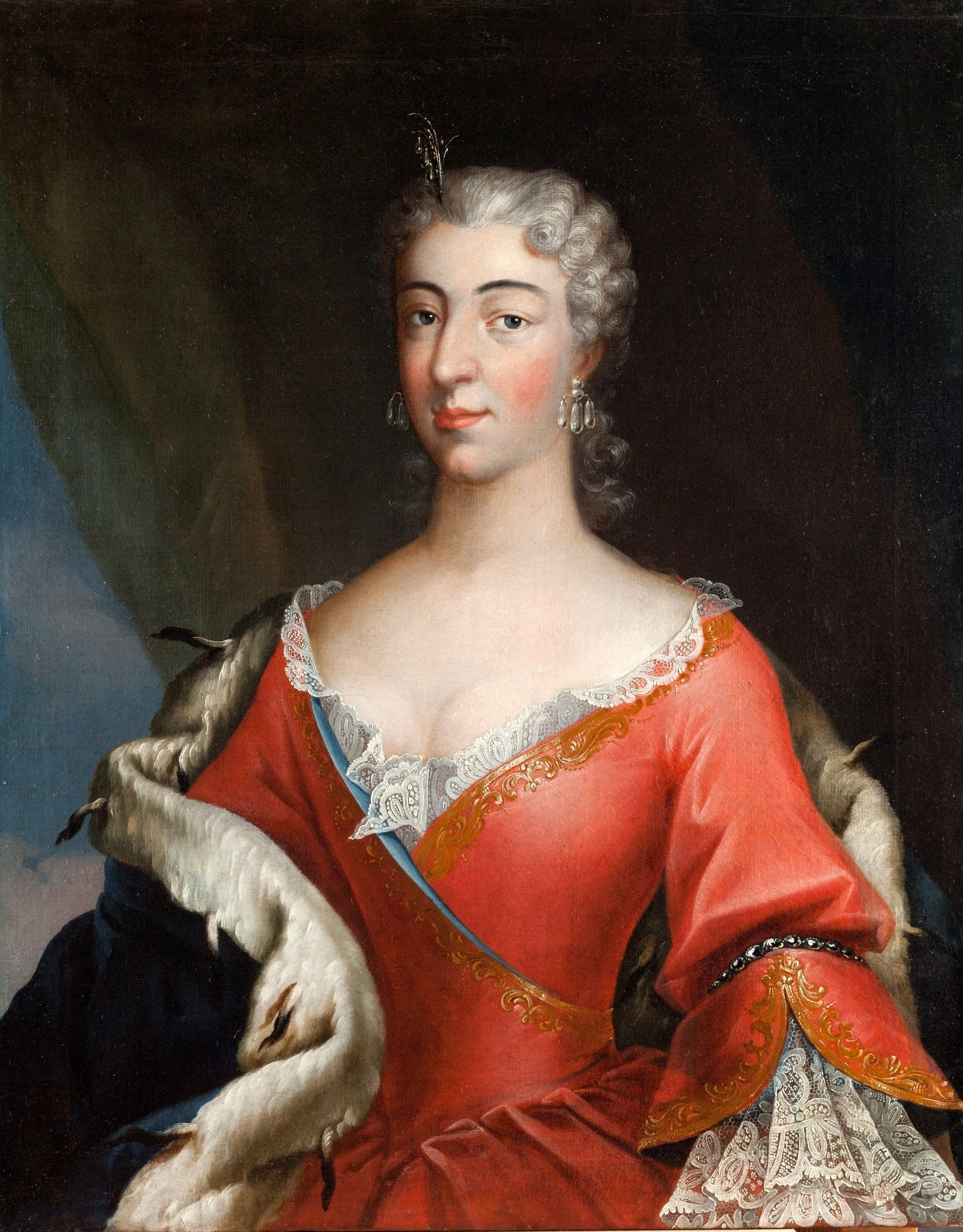
- Born: 15 April 1699
- Died: 21 May 1771 (aged 72); Warsaw, Poland
- Noble family: Sieniawski (by birth); Dönhoff (by marriage); Czartoryski (by marriage)
- Spouses: Stanislaw Donhoff; August Aleksander Czartoryski
- Issue: with August Aleksander Czartoryski; Elżbieta Czartoryska; Adam Kazimierz Czartoryski; Stanisław Czartoryski
- Father: Adam Mikołaj Sieniawski
- Mother: Elżbieta Helena Lubomirska

Countess Maria Zofia Czartoryska (née Sieniawska; 15 April 1699 – 21 May 1771) was a Polish noblewoman (szlachcianka). By birth she was member of powerful Sieniawski family and by marriage she was member of House of Dönhoff and House of Czartoryski.

== Early life ==
Countess Zofia was daughter of Count Adam Mikołaj Sieniawski and Princess Elżbieta Lubomirska.

== First marriage ==
She married firstly Count Stanislaus Ernst von Dönhoff in 1724. She was his second wife. He was previously married to his cousin, Countess Johanna Katharina von Dönhoff (1686–1723). Zofia's stepdaughter Countess Konstanza von Dönhoff later married Prince Janusz Aleksander Sanguszko.

== Inheritance ==
After her father's death in 1726, Zofia inherited his Ruthenian estates including 35 towns, 235 villages and Berezhany fortress, she was also the only heir of her first husband's estates and of her mother's fortune.

== Second marriage ==
Among the candidates to the hand of one of the wealthiest women in Europe were Prince Charles de Bourbon-Condé, Count of Charolais, supported by France (Louis XV even invited Zofia to Versailles); Portuguese infante Dom Manuel de Bragança supported by the Habsburgs (proposed as the next King of Poland, due to the tenets of the Löwenwolde's Treaty), Jan Klemens Branicki, Franciszek Salezy Potocki, Jan Tarło and August Aleksander Czartoryski, who eventually won the competition, full of duels and speech encounters due to support of Augustus II, as the latter was afraid of increase of power of his opponents. She married Prince August Aleksander Czartoryski on 17 July 1731 in Warsaw.
