= Marianna Lubomirska =

Polish noblewoman (1693–1729)

- Princess
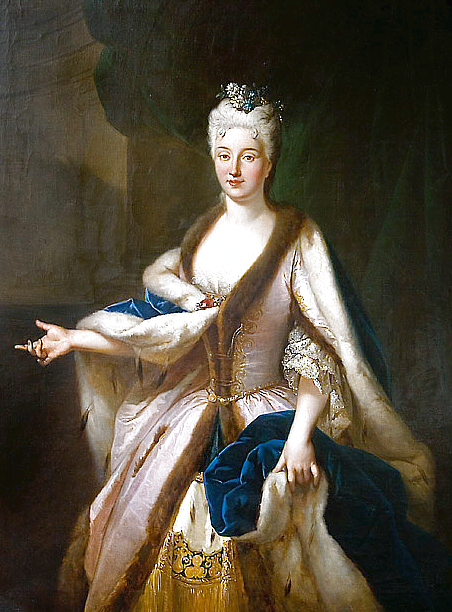

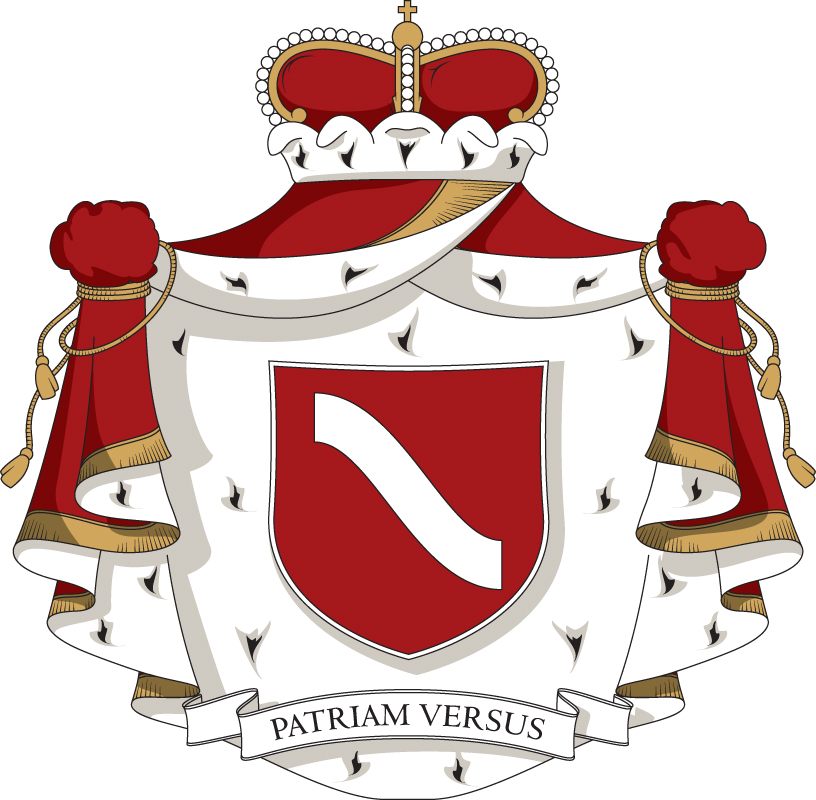
- Coat of arms: Szreniawa bez Krzyża
- Full name: Marianna ks. Lubomirska z Lubomierza h. Drużyna
- Born: 1693
- Died: 1729 (aged 35–36)
- Family: House of Lubomirski
- Consort: Paweł Karol Sanguszko
- Issue: Jan Aleksander Sanguszko
- Father: Józef Karol Lubomirski
- Mother: Teofilia Ludwika Zasławska

Princess Marianna Lubomirska (1693–1729) was a Polish noblewoman magnate. She was heiress of large Ostróg estates.

Daughter of Grand Marshal of the Crown Józef Karol Lubomirski, the son of Voivode of Kraków Aleksander Michał Lubomirski and Princess Helena Tekla Ossolińska and Princes Teofila Ludwika Zasławska, the daughter of Prince Władysław Dominik Zasławski and Katarzyna Sobieska (sister of King of Poland Jan III Sobieski).

== Marriage and issue ==
Marianna married Prince Paweł Karol Sanguszko and had one son:

- Janusz Aleksander Sanguszko, the last ordynat of the Ostrogski Family Fee Tail and Court Marshal of Lithuania, married Countess Konstancja von Dönhoff, the daughter of Field Hetman of Lithuania Count Stanislaus Michael Ernest von Dönhoff.
