= Aleksander Lubomirski =

Aleksander Lubomirski may refer to:

- Aleksander Dominik Lubomirski (1693–1720), Polish nobleman (szlachcic)
- Aleksander Ignacy Lubomirski (1802–1893), Polish noble, financier and philanthropist
- Aleksander Lubomirski (1751–1804), Polish nobleman, castellan of Kiev 1785–1790
- Aleksander Michał Lubomirski (d. 1675), Polish noble (szlachcic)
- Aleksander Michał Lubomirski (d. 1677) (1614–1677), Polish szlachcic

== See also ==
- Jerzy Aleksander Lubomirski (died 1735), Polish szlachcic
- Józef Aleksander Lubomirski (1751–1817), Polish nobleman, castellan of Kiev 1790–1795
