= Teresa Lubomirska =

Polish noblewoman (1685–1712)

- Princess
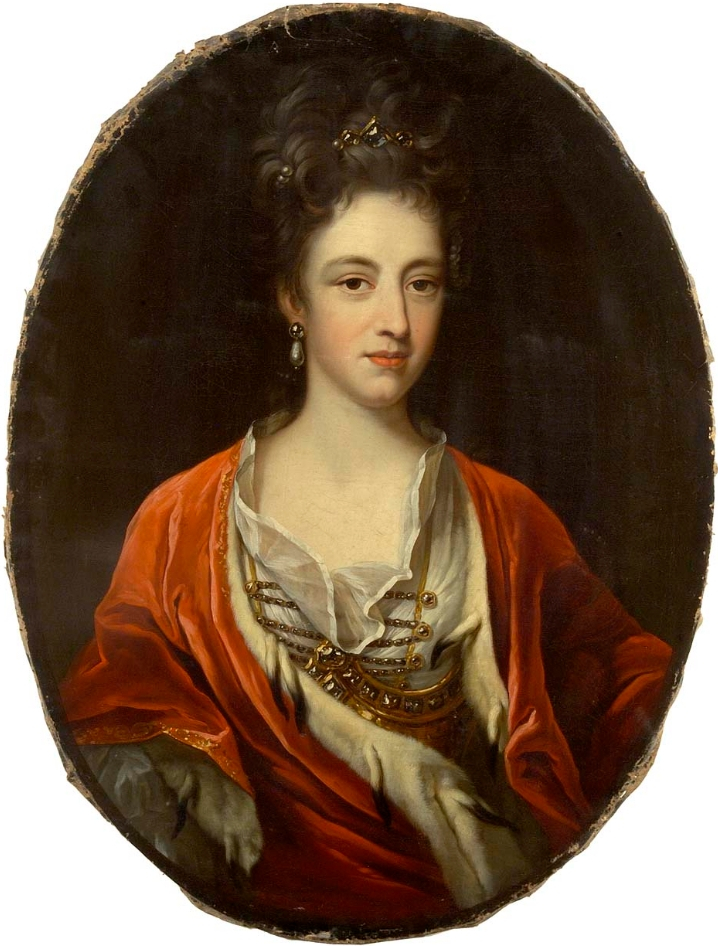
- Portrait by Jan Frans van Douven, 1701–1710

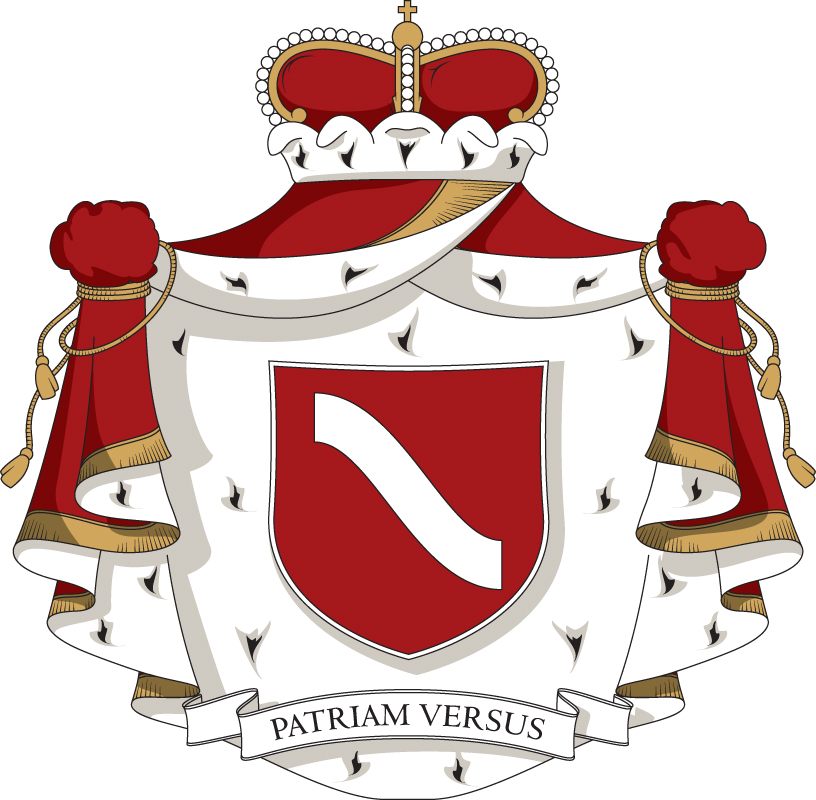
- Coat of arms: Szreniawa bez Krzyża
- Full name: Teresa ks. Lubomirska z Lubomierza h. Drużyna
- Born: 1 January 1685
- Died: 6 January 1712 (aged 27)
- Noble family: House of Lubomirski
- Consort: Charles III Philip
- Issue: Theophila Elisabeth Franziska Felicitas of Pfalz-Neuburg; Anna Elisabeth Theophila of Pfalz-Neuburg
- Father: Józef Karol Lubomirski
- Mother: Teofilia Ludwika Zasławska

Princess Teresa Katharina Lubomirska (1 January 1685 – 6 January 1712) was a Polish noblewoman. She was the second spouse of Count Palatine Charles Philip of Neuburg, who became Elector Palatine (as Charles III Philip) four years after her death. By birth, she was member of House of Lubomirski.

== Life ==
She was the elder daughter of Court and Grand Marshal, Prince Józef Karol Lubomirski and his wife Princess Teofilia Ludwika Zasławska, niece of Polish King Jan III Sobieski. Her siblings were Aleksander Dominik and Marianna.

She married Charles III Philip (Wittelsbach), heir to the Electorate of the Palatinate, on 15 December 1701 in Kraków. He had one surviving child from his previous marriage, an eight-year-old daughter, Elisabeth Auguste Sophie.

She bore Charles Philip two daughters, both of whom died young. Theophila Elisabeth Franziska Felicitas was born 13 November 1703 and died on 31 January 1705, when she was one year old. Anna Elisabeth Theophila was born four years later on 9 June 1709, and died aged two, on 10 February 1712. She was born and died in Innsbruck.

Princess Lubomirska also died in 1712.

Her husband became Elector of the Palatinate in 1716 and did not remarry until 1728.
