= Kasper Doenhoff =

Polish noble

Prince Kasper Doenhoff (German: Kaspar von Dönhoff, Polish: Kacper Denhoff, 1587–1645) was a Polish nobleman of Baltic-German extraction, a Reichsfürst of the Holy Roman Empire and Governor of Dorpat Province within the Polish–Lithuanian Commonwealth. Upon converting to Catholicism, he became a trusted courtier and advisor to Sigismund III of Poland.

== Early life ==
Kasper Doenhoff was the son of Gerhard von Dönhoff (1554–1598) and his wife, Margaretha von Zweiffeln (1555–1622). He was the brother of Ernst Magnus von Dönhoff (Governor of Parnawa) (1581–1642), Hermann von Dönhoff (1591–1620) and Gerhard von Dönhoff, Governor of Pomorze (1590–1648) and Anna von Maydel (1585–1639).

== Career ==
Kasper Doenhoff was the first member of his family to enter the magnate ruling elite of the Polish–Lithuanian Commonwealth, thereby laying the foundations for his family's fortune in the country. A member of an old Westphalian, Prussian and Baltic-German House of Dönhoff, that also included Ernst Magnus Dönhoff and Marion Dönhoff, Doenhoff became a military commander (rotmistrz of reiters); a favorite of King Sigismund III Vasa; and one of the most prominent members of the "court faction" that advocated strengthening the Polish monarch's power.

As a courtier of King Władysław IV Vasa, Doenhoff was sent with a diplomatic mission to propose the marriage of Archduchess Cecilia Renata of Austria, daughter of Holy Roman Emperor Ferdinand II, to Władysław IV. The mission was successful, and Doenhoff also received noble title of Fürst from the Holy Roman Emperor.

== Titles ==
He became titular Governor of Dorpat (1627–1634) (although already in 1625 the town had capitulated to Sweden and was never reobtained by the Poles); from 1633, Count of the Holy Roman Empire (along with Ernst and Gerhard von Dönhoff); Governor of Sieradz (1634–45); Court Marshal of the Queen (from 1639); and starosta of Wieluń, Lauenburg (Lębork), Radomsko, Bolesławiec, Sokal, Małoszyce, Sobowidze and Klonowo.

In the Holy Roman Empire, he was a noble (Reichsfürst); count (from 1635); prince (from 1637); and court marshal.

== Residences and building projects ==
Doenhoff was influential and wealthy, enabling him to fund several interesting construction projects, mostly in Sieradz Province. He ordered the rebuilding of a medieval castle at Bolesławiec (of which he was starosta), on the Prosna River, into a new residence, complete with Italian garden. Around 1630 he sponsored a Renaissance-Baroque castle in Kruszyna — the last residential complex in Poland planned around a Renaissance-style internal yard, but already with a Baroque-style grand front yard and garden.

Kruszyna was Doenhoff's main residence; but it was inconveniently located far from the new Commonwealth capital, Warsaw. Hence in 1636 Doenhoff bought and rebuilt another estate, in Ujazdów, near Warsaw, where he replaced the old Ujazdów Castle with a Baroque palace.

Toward the end of his life, he ordered the construction of a family necropolis, centered around a domed chapel, in the Jasna Góra sanctuary at Częstochowa. It was completed by his descendants.

Despite his ownership of several castles, Doenhoff often resided in a modest manor (dworek szlachecki) near the royal residence at Warsaw.

== Family ==
In 1620 he married Anna Aleksandra Koniecpolska (1598–1651). They had four children:

- Prince Aleksander von Dönhoff (d. 1671)
- Prince Stanislaw von Dönhoff (d. 1653), married Princess Anna Eufemia Radziwill (1628–1663), had issue
- Princess Anna von Dönhoff (1620–1651), married Bogusław Leszczyński and became great-grandmother of Marie Leszczyńska
- Prince Zygmunt von Dönhoff (1621–1655), married Princess Teresa Krystina Ossolinska (d. 1651); had issue

== See also ==
- Stanisław Ernest Denhoff (1673–1728)
