= Teofila Ludwika Zasławska =

Polish noble (c. 1650 – 1709)

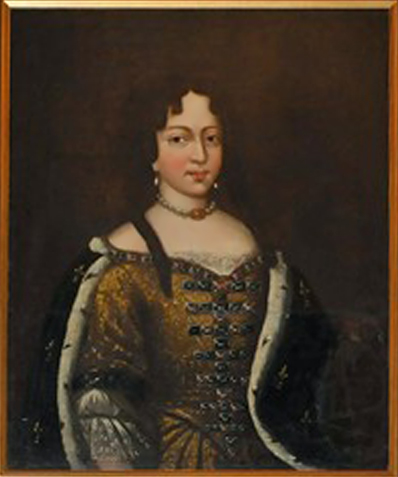

- Coat of arms: Ostrogski coat of arms
- Born: c. 1650
- Died: 1709
- Noble family: House of Ostrogski
- Consorts: Dymitr Jerzy Wiśniowiecki; Józef Karol Lubomirski
- Issue: with Józef Karol Lubomirski Aleksander Dominik Lubomirski; Teresa Lubomirska Marianna Lubomirska
- Father: Władysław Dominik Zasławski
- Mother: Katarzyna Sobieska

Princess Teofila Ludwika Zasławska (c. 1650 – November 15, 1709) was a member of the Polish nobility (Polish: szlachta), known as the perhaps most significant heiress and landowner of her contemporary Poland.

She was the daughter of Katarzyna Sobieska, who was the sister of Jan III Sobieski, the king of The Kingdom of Poland and the Grand Duchy of Lithuania. Her father was Władysław Dominik Zasławski, a Polish nobleman of Ruthenian stock of the house of Ostrogski, one of the richest magnates in Poland.

Teofila Ludwika Zasławska was an heiress of the Ostrogski family, one of the great Ruthenian princely families of the Grand Duchy of Lithuania. She was the fifth ordinate of the Ostrogski Ordination (one of the largest landed estates in the Polish–Lithuanian Commonwealth). Her father was the third, and one of her sons would become the sixth ordinate of it.

== Life ==
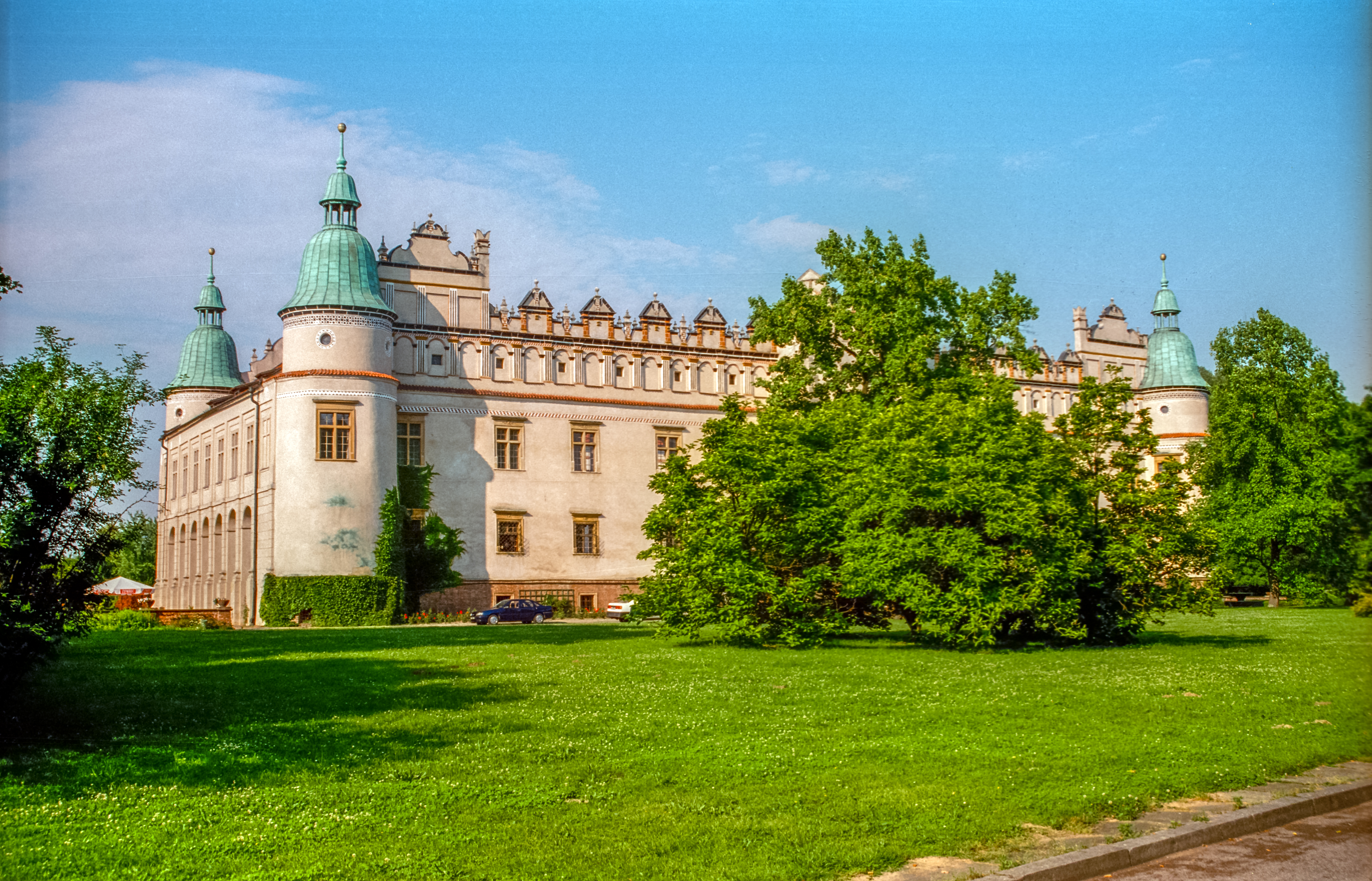
Palace in Baranów owned consecutively with both of her husbands (1677–1720), where Teofila lived with her children

Teofila Ludwika Zasławska married the Great Crown Hetman, Dymitr Jerzy Wiśniowiecki in 1671, and after his death in 1682, married Prince Józef Karol Lubomirski (Joseph Carl Lubomirski) in 1683.

Upon her first husband's death, she inherited holdings that included Baranów Sandomierski Castle, which had become her main residence in 1677. After the death of her brother, Aleksander Janusz Zasławski in 1673, she became the only heir to one of the largest estates in the Commonwealth, the Ostrogski Ordination. This ordination was the largest one in the Volhyn, accounting for 11,000 square kilometres (4,200 sq mi) – about a third of the Volhynian Voivodeship – with over 1,000 settlements, including several dozen towns. As a result of her marriage to Lubomirski, the large landed estates of the Ostrogski Ordination in Poland were transferred to the Lubomirski family. The combined fortune of Zasławskis and Lubomirskis would become for a time the largest fortune in the Commonwealth.

Lubomirskis owned several palaces where they lived, all of them designed or redesigned by the royal architect Tylman van Gameren, including palaces in Lublin, Warsaw, Lubartów, and the Baranów Sandomierski Castle in Baranów. The Baranów Sandomierski Castle with arcaded courtyard, and surrounded by massive gardens, became commonly known as the "little Wawel".

She and Lubomirski had three children, Prince Aleksander Dominik Lubomirski, Princess Teresa Lubomirska, and Princess Marianna Lubomirska. Prince Józef Karol Lubomirski had an ongoing extramarital affair which became public, resulting in Teofila's attempt at declaring him legally insane. They were formally separated until his death in 1702.
