= Baranów Sandomierski Castle =

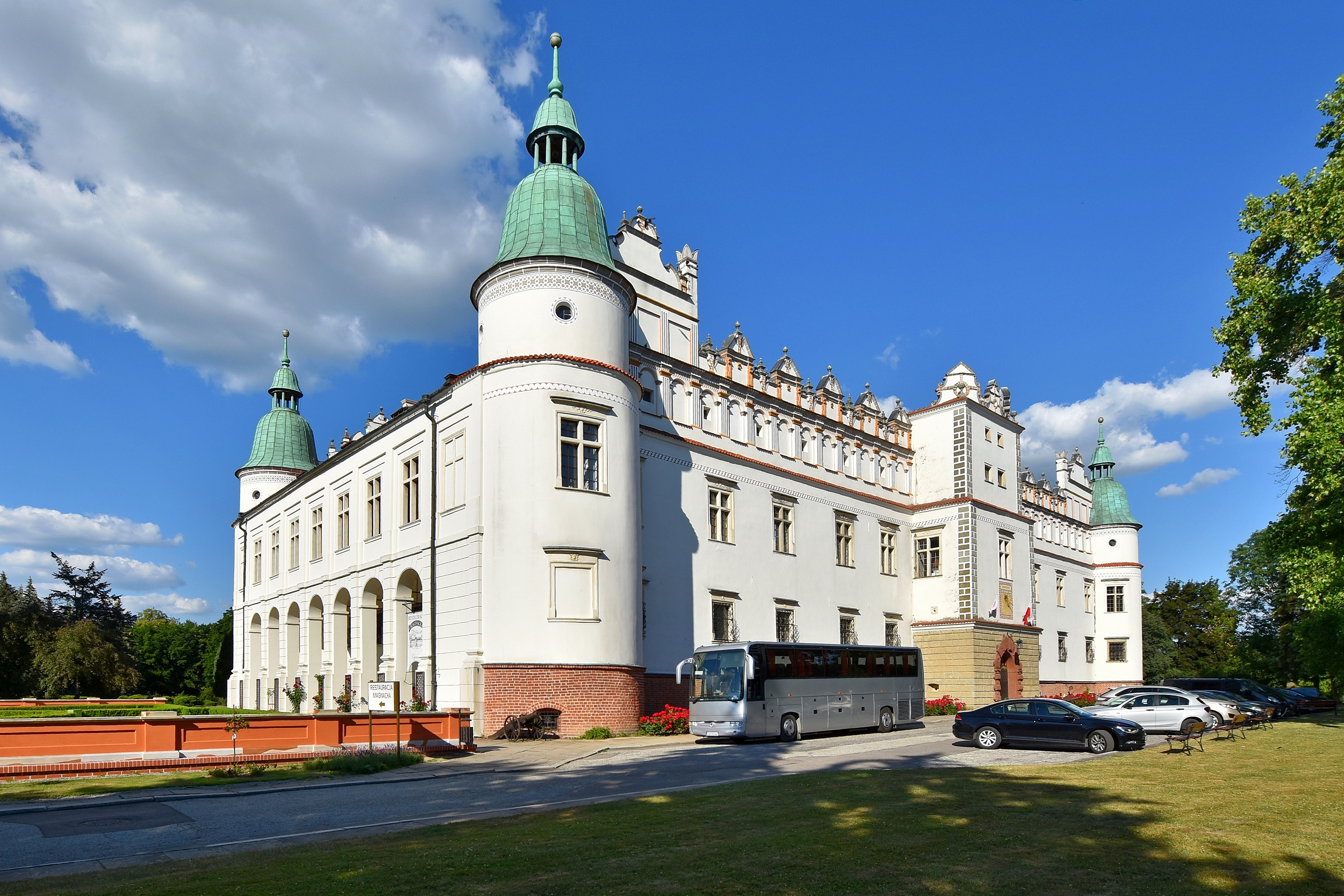
- Baranów Sandomierski Castle

- Location within Poland

General information
- Architectural style: Polish Mannerism
- Location: Baranów Sandomierski, Poland
- Coordinates: 50°30′07″N 21°32′00″E
- Construction started: 1591
- Completed: 1606

Design and construction
- Architects: Attributed to Santi Gucci. Rebuilt by Tylman van Gameren.

The Baranów Sandomierski Castle is a Mannerist castle located in the town of Baranów Sandomierski in the Subcarpathian Voivodeship, south-eastern Poland. It is one of the most important Mannerist structures in the country. The castle is commonly known as the "little Wawel". Originally a residency of the Lubomirski family, it now serves as a historical museum, hotel and conference centre.

== History ==
The castle was built around the years 1591–1606 in the style of Poland's Mannerism with richly decorated attics, side towers and an arcade courtyard for Andrzej and Rafał Leszczyński (1526–1592) of the Wieniawa coat of arms. It is believed to be the work of a famous Italian architect, Santi Gucci, the court artist of king Stephen Báthory. In about 1620 the castle was surrounded by bastion fortifications and in 1625 its chambers were adorned with early Baroque decorations executed by the eminent stucco decorator Giovanni Battista Falconi.

By the end of the 17th century, the castle came into the possession of the Lubomirski family through marriage. Prince Józef Karol Lubomirski wedded its owner, Princess Teofila Ludwika Zasławska in 1683, and rebuilt her principal residence by way of commissioning the royal Dutch-Polish architect Tylman van Gameren (Tylman Gamerski) from the court of Jan III Sobieski, who converted the castle, added the western wing gallery and embellished the interiors with profuse late-baroque stucco decorations. The gallery housed their collection of art. Notably, almost two centuries later, all works of art were destroyed in massive fires, first in 1848 (with the entire library) under Krasicki family and finally in 1898 under Dolańskis.

Castle in Baranów Sandomierski passed successively into the possession of families: Wiśniowiecki, Sanguszko, Lubomirski, Małachowski, Potocki and Krasicki. In 1867 it was acquired by Feliks Dolański. The structure was restored by subsequent owner Stanisław Dolański after a fire in 1898. Under the direction of Kraków architect Tadeusz Stryjeński some changes were carried out in the layout. During this reconstruction one of the chambers on the ground floor was adopted as a chapel and decorated in Art Nouveau style. Stained-glass windows by Józef Mehoffer and an altar with a painting of Jacek Malczewski Our Lady of the Immaculate Conception were major features of the interior. The castle remained in the possession of the Dolański family till the outbreak of World War II. Due to war damages the castle was renovated by the State in the years 1959–1969, under the guidance of professor Alfred Majewski. The building's sponsorship was turned over to state-run Sulphur Mines and "Siarkopol" plant in nearby Tarnobrzeg.

== Gallery ==
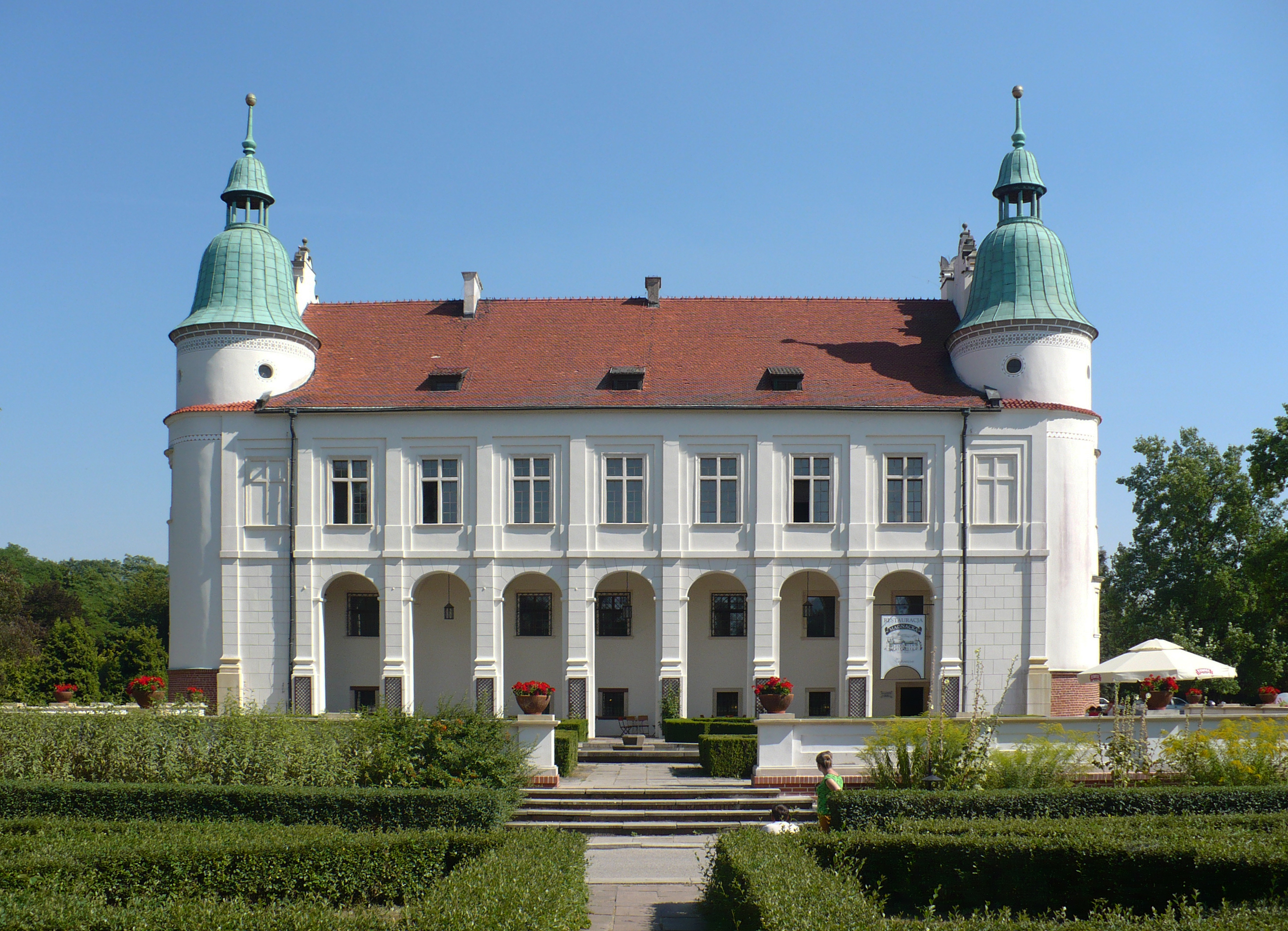
Baranów Sandomierski castle and garden

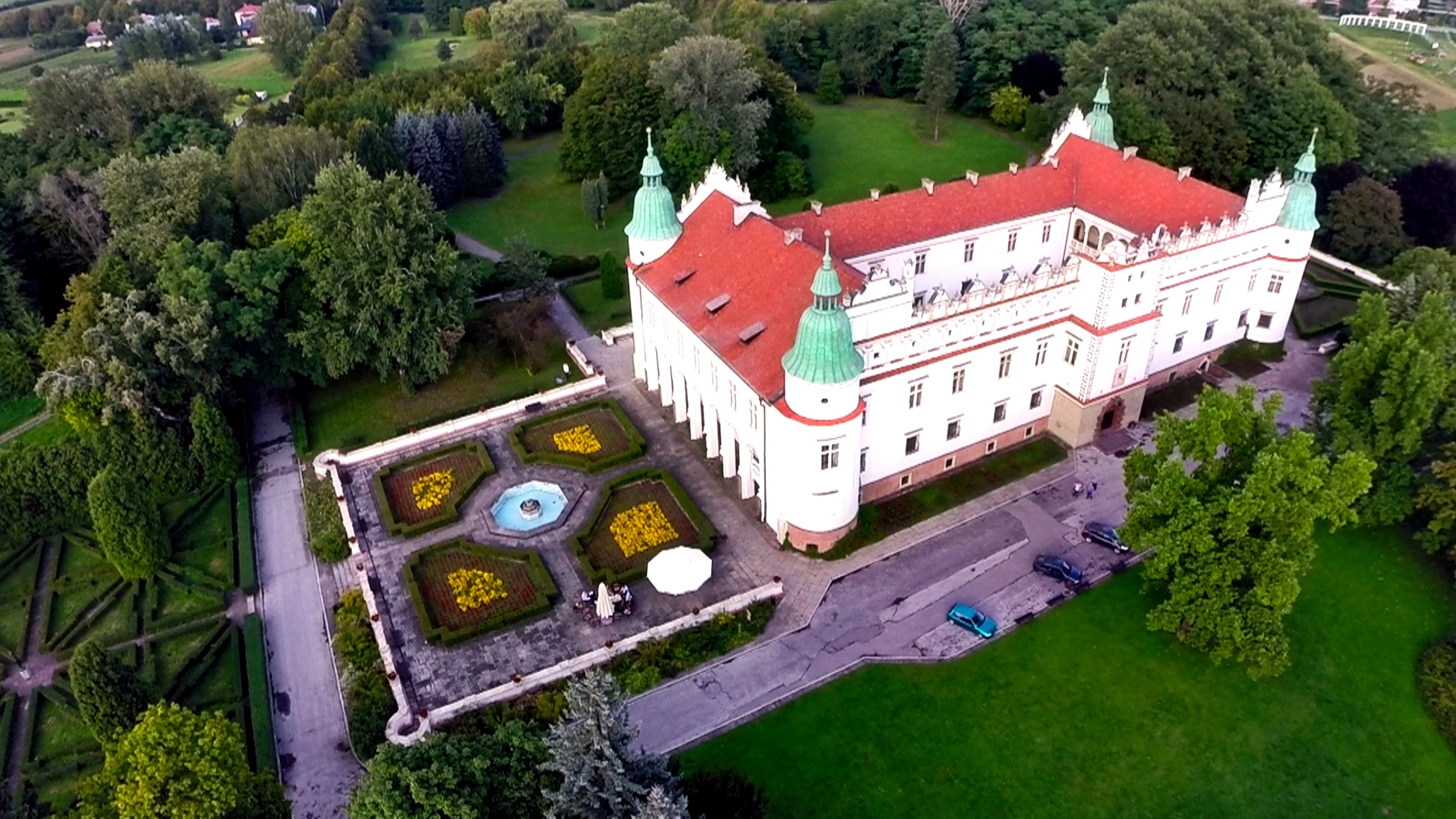
Aerial view

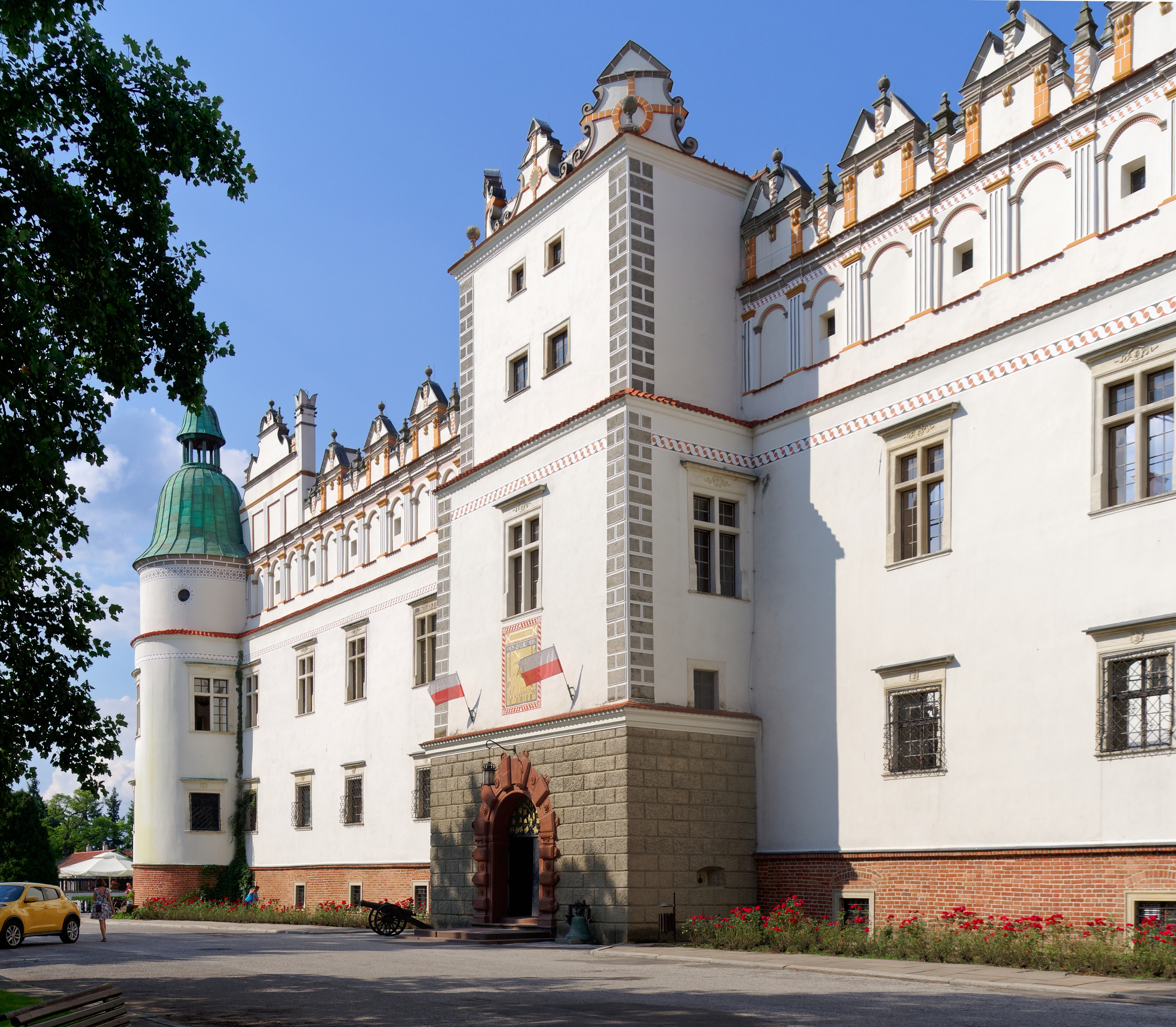
Entrance

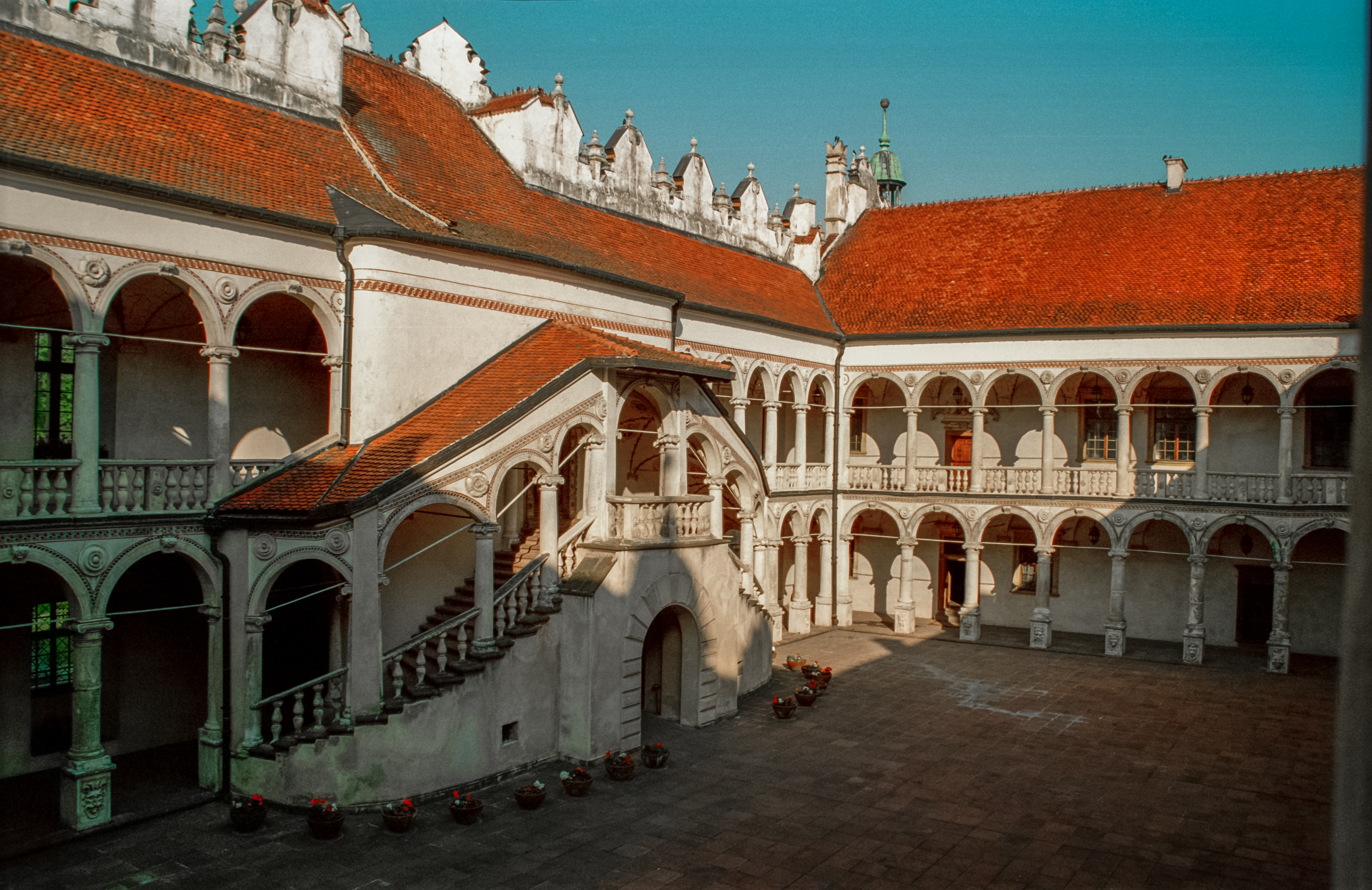
Mannerist arcaded courtyard of the castle

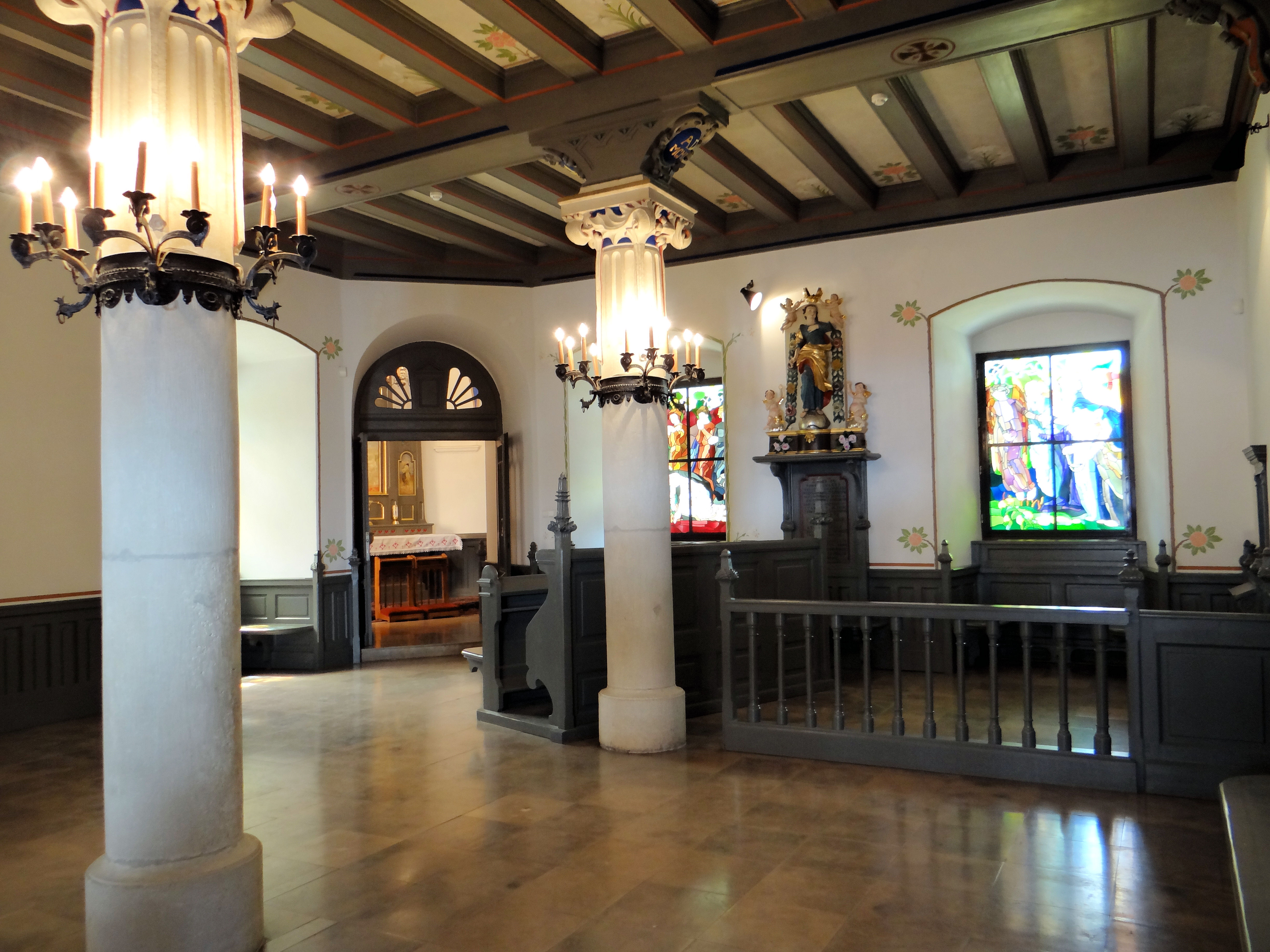
The chapel in the castle

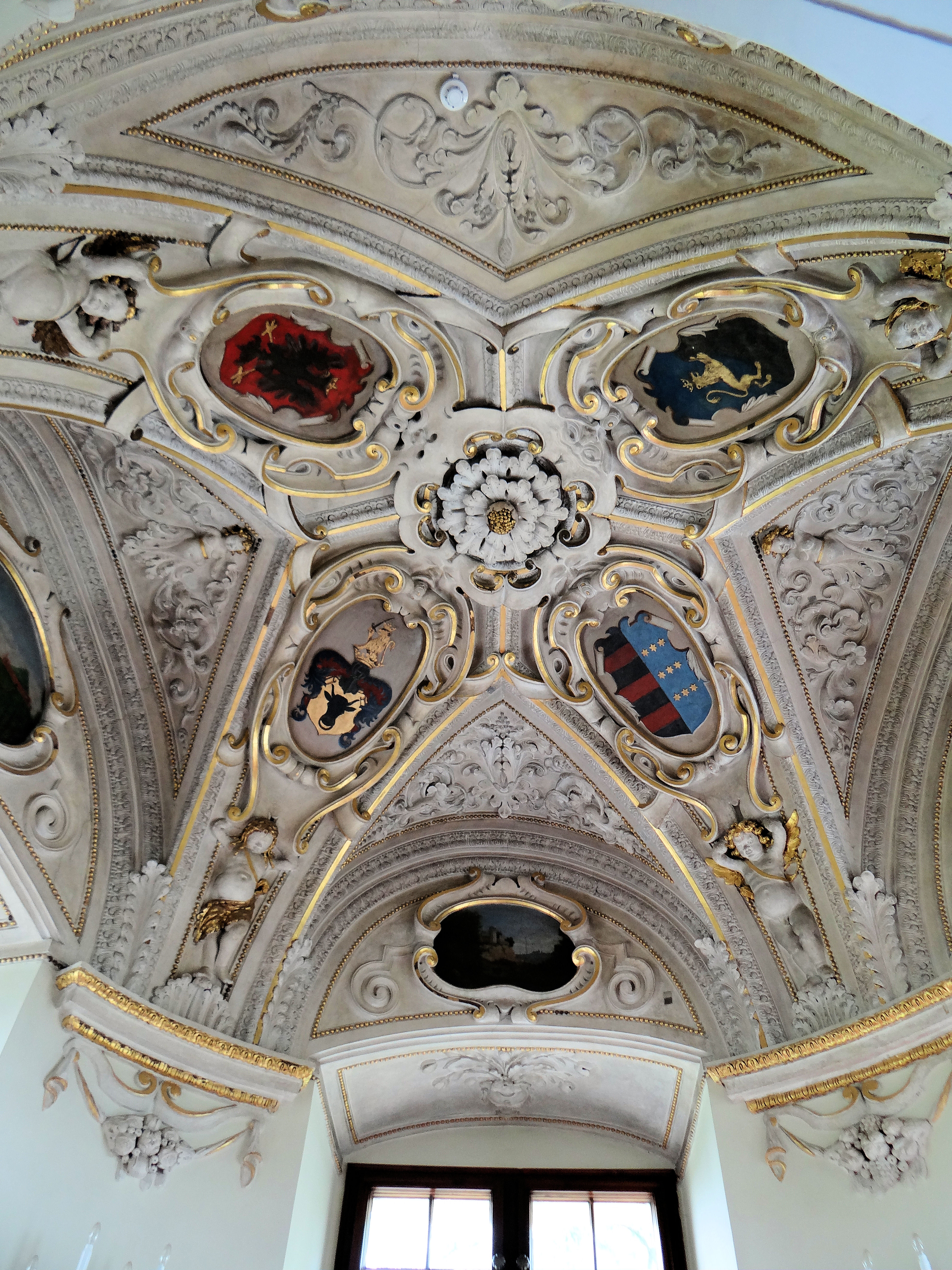
Interior

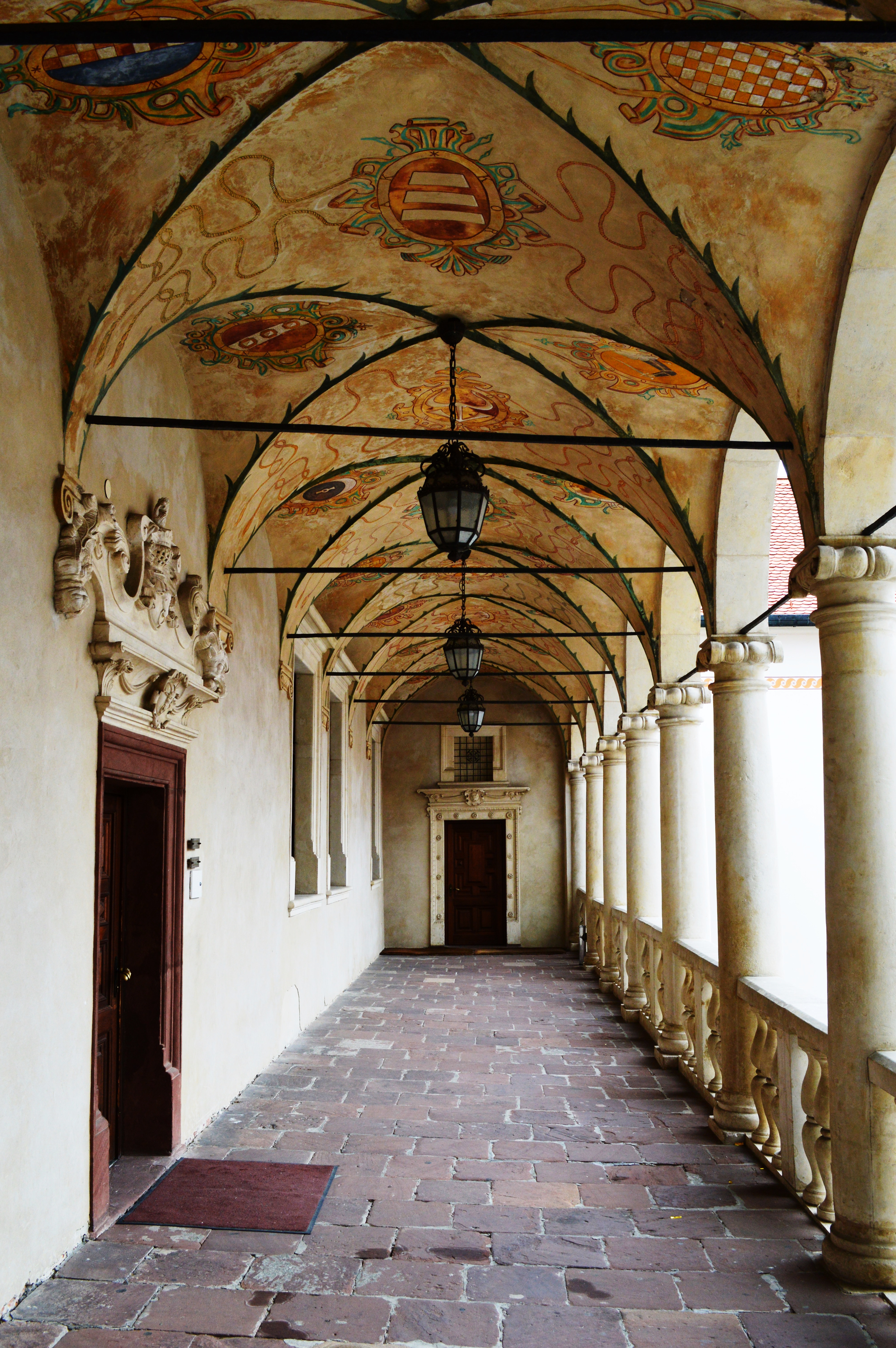
Pillared cloister

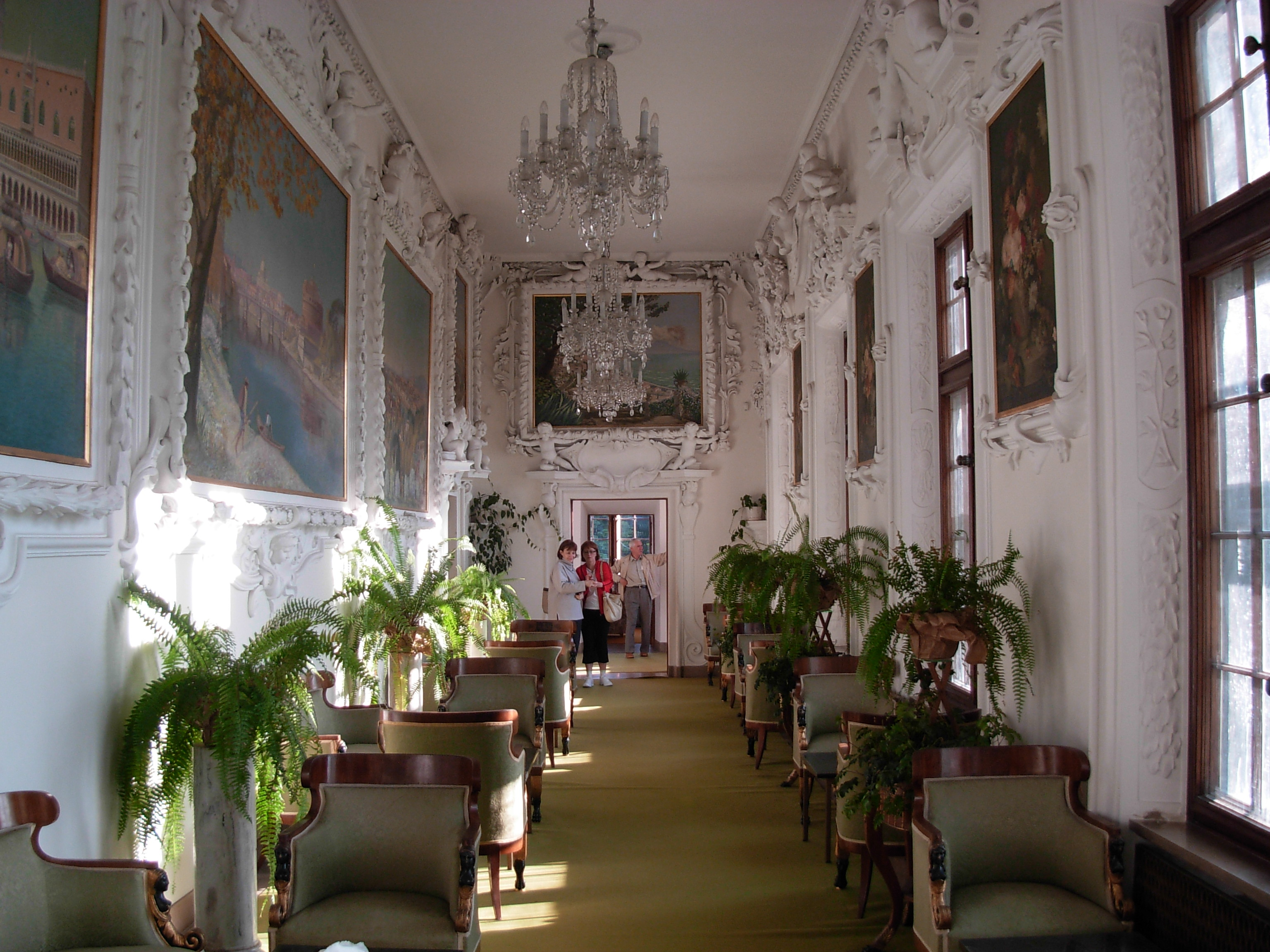
Castle hall (Gallery Tylmanowska)

== See also ==
- List of mannerist structures in Southern Poland
- Castles in Poland
