= Denhoff (surname) =

Denhoff is a surname associated with the Dönhoff family. Notable people with the surname include:

- Jan Kazimierz Denhoff (1649–1697), Polish cardinal and theologian
- Marianna Denhoff, German-Polish aristocrat
- Michael Denhoff, German composer and cellist
- Stanisław Ernest Denhoff (c. 1673 – 1728), Polish–Lithuanian noble
