= Aleksander Dominik Lubomirski =

Polish nobleman (1693–1720)

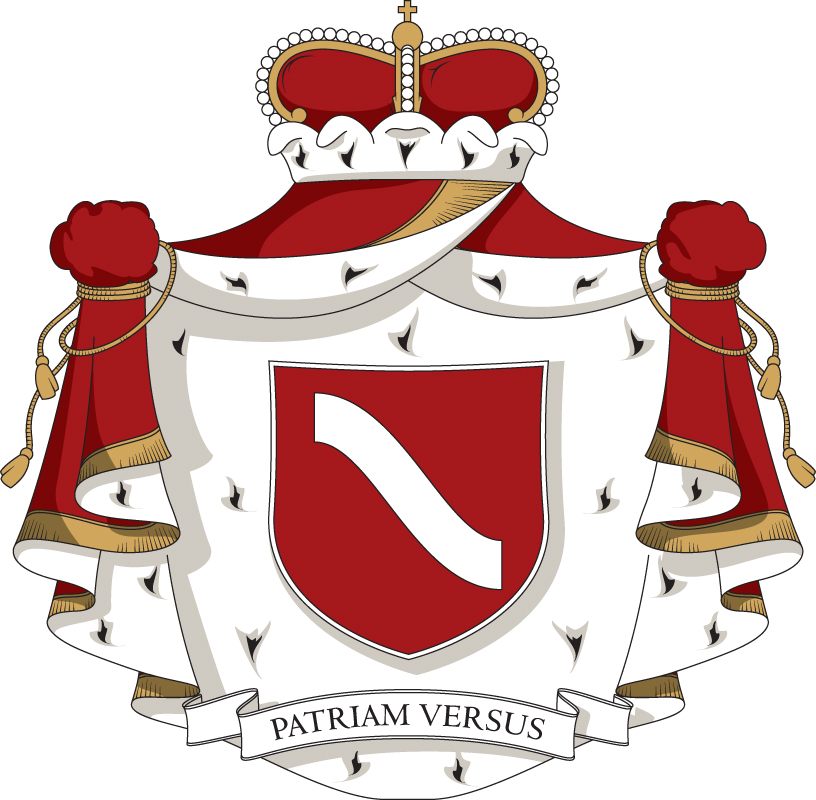
- Coat of arms: Szreniawa bez Krzyża
- Full name: Aleksander Dominik Józef ks. Lubomirski z Lubomierza h. Drużyna
- Born: 1693
- Died: 1720 (aged 26–27)
- Family: House of Lubomirski
- Father: Józef Karol Lubomirski
- Mother: Teofilia Ludwika Zasławska

Prince Aleksander Dominik Lubomirski (1693–1720) was a Polish nobleman (szlachcic), starost of Sandomierz, Zator and Ryki and the IV ordynat of the Ostrogski Family Fee Tail. He was the owner of the Wiśnicz, Dubno and Zasław estates.

He was the son of Grand Marshal of the Crown Józef Karol Lubomirski and Princess Teofila Ludwika Zasławska. His paternal grandparents were Voivode of Kraków Aleksander Michał Lubomirski and Princess Helena Tekla Ossolińska. His maternal grandparents were Prince Władysław Dominik Zasławski and Katarzyna Sobieska (sister of King of Poland Jan III Sobieski).
