= Konstancja Sanguszko =

Polish noblewoman and magnate (1716–1791)

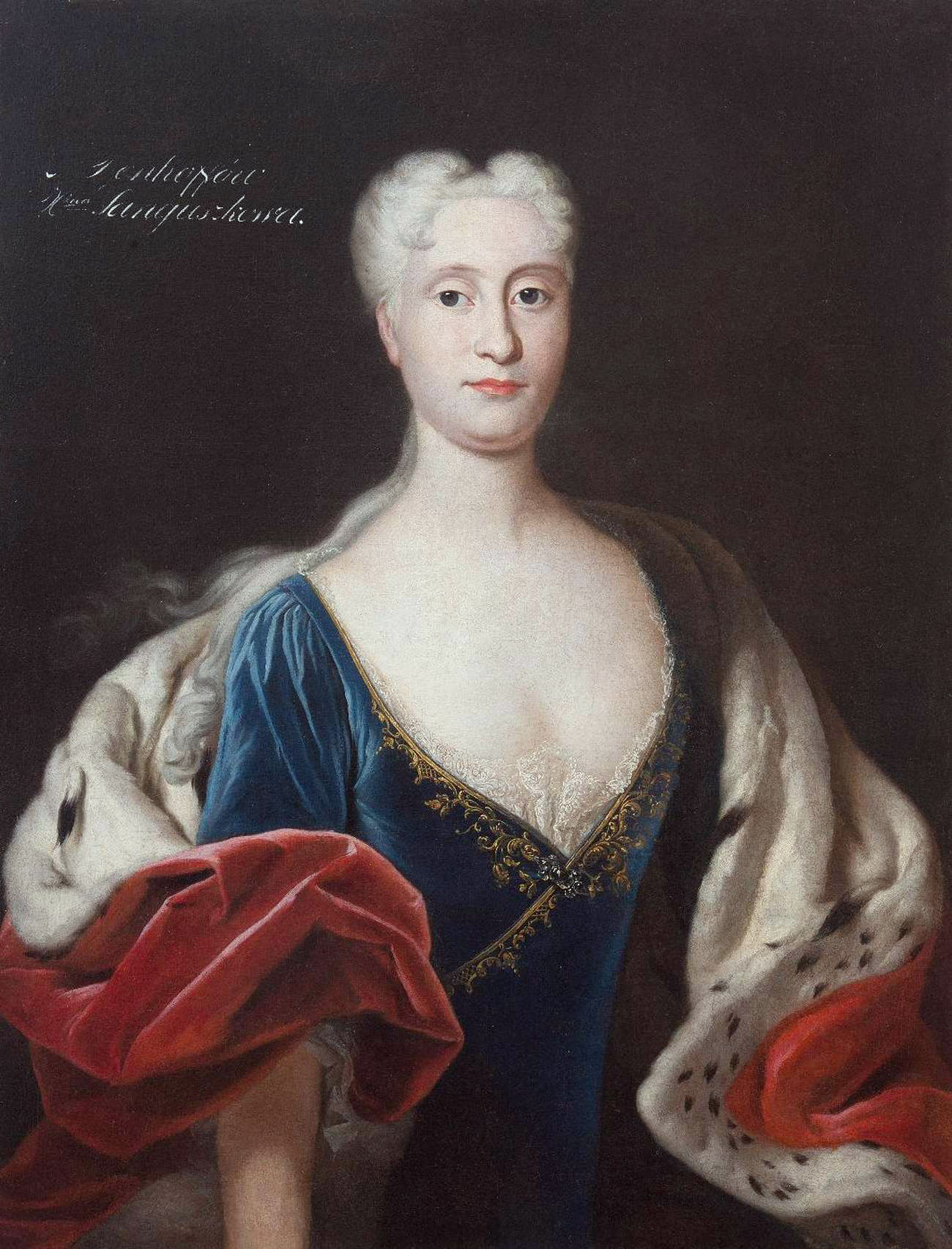
- Kanstancyja Sanguška (Denhaf); Канстанцыя Сангушка (Дэнгаф)
- Born: 1716
- Died: 1791 (aged 74–75)
- Known for: political role during the Bar Confederation (1768–1772)
- Spouse(s): Janusz Aleksander Sanguszko (m. 1731) Józef Rogaliński (m. 1780)
- Parents: Stanisław Ernest Denhoff (father); Joanna Catherine Denhoff (mother)

Princess Konstancja Sanguszko (1716–1791) was a Polish noblewoman and magnate. She was a member of the influential Sanguszko family and played a significant role in the political and social life of the Polish–Lithuanian Commonwealth.

She was the daughter of Count Stanislas Ernst von Dönhoff and Countess Maria Katharina Johanna von Dönhoff (1686–1723). Konstancja was married to Prince Janusz Aleksander Sanguszko in 1731. She lived separated from her spouse, who was homosexual and abandoned her shortly after the wedding. She lived in Gdansk, and played a political role during the Bar Confederation (1768–1772), when she contributed to the formation of the Confederation. In 1780, she remarried Józef Rogaliński, who abandoned her, wasted her fortune and left her to die in poverty. She was involved in long lawsuits with both of her husbands which attracted great attention.
