= Józef Karol Lubomirski =

Polish noble (1638–1702)

- Prince
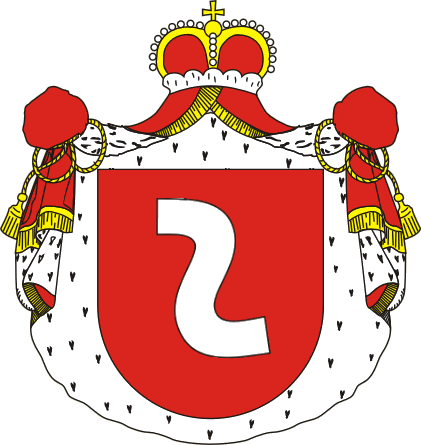
- Coat of arms: Lubomirski
- Born: 1638
- Died: 1702 (aged 63–64)
- Family: Lubomirski
- Consort: Teofilia Ludwika Zasławska
- Issue: Aleksander Dominik Lubomirski; Teresa Lubomirska; Marianna Lubomirska
- Father: Aleksander Michał Lubomirski
- Mother: Helena Tekla Ossolińska

Prince Józef Karol Lubomirski (1638–1702) was a Polish noble.

He was owner of Dubno, Wiśnicz, Tarnów and Zesław, Crown Koniuszy since 1683, Crown Court Marshals since 1692, Crown Grand Marshal in 1702, starosta of Sandomierz and Zator. He married the niece of John III Sobieski, Teofila Ludwika Zasławska; they separated due to constant quarrels and Józef's "nymphomaniacal excesses".
