= Dönhoff =

German noble family

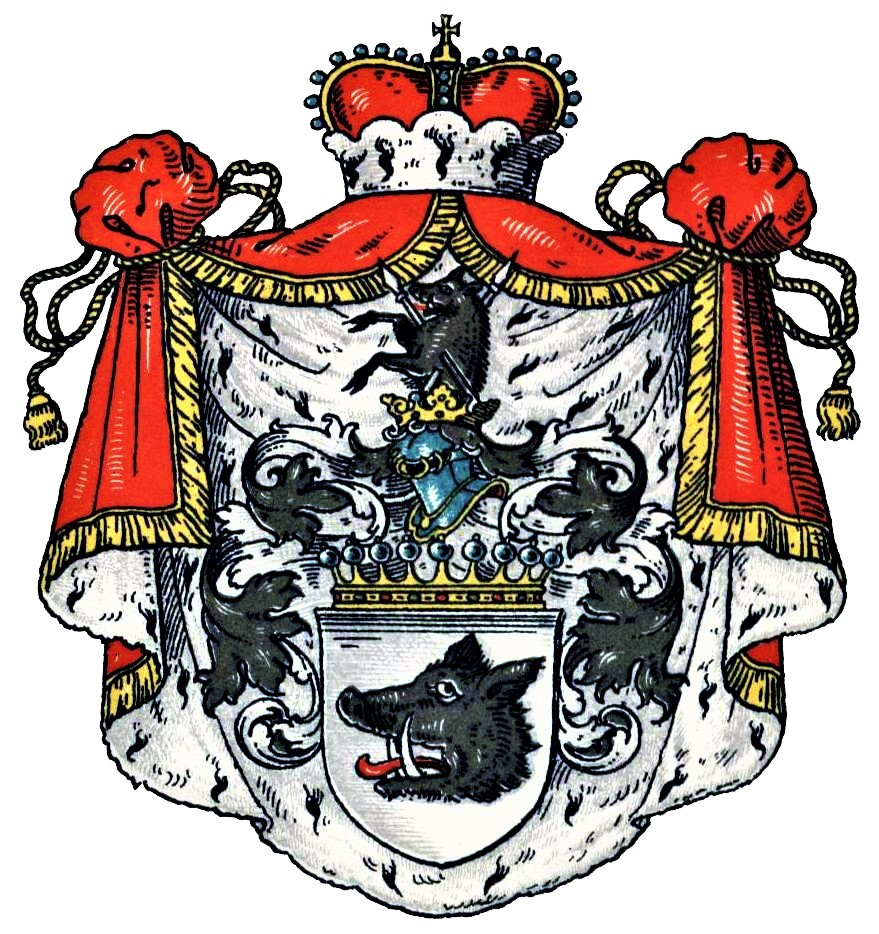
Coat of arms of the House of Dönhoff, as part of the German nobility in 1903

The House of Dönhoff (Polish: Denhoff, sometimes also Doenhoff) was an old and influential German noble family that later became prominent in Prussia and was incorporated into the Baltic-German and Polish-Lithuanian nobility. The family consisted of one princely line (died out) and other comital lines.

== History ==
It was first mentioned in 1282, in the County of Mark in Westphalia. Their original seat was Dönhof near Witten which remained in the family until 1463. From 1303 until the 16th century a property called Dönhoff near Wetter (Ruhr) was also owned by the family.

Younger sons of the family served as knights of the Teutonic Order and acquired property in the Baltic State of the Teutonic Order: In 1410 Godecke von Dönhoff (d. before 1444) owned the estate of Allo in Estonia, in 1478 Hermann von Dönhof was granted land in Livonia. In the 16th century, a branch became recognized as szlachta (Polish nobility) in the Polish–Lithuanian Commonwealth.

After the secularization of the State of the Teutonic Order during the Protestant Reformation in 1525, the East Prussian branch served the House of Hohenzollern in its newly acquired Duchy of Prussia. This branch owned Friedrichstein Palace from 1666 until 1945.

In 1633 all branches of the family were created imperial counts. In 1637 one of the Polish Denhoff branches was granted the title of Imperial Prince, which was later extinguished.

== Notable members of the German branch ==
- Alexander von Dönhoff (1683–1742), Prussian Lieutenant-General
- Sophie von Dönhoff (1768–1838), morganatic spouse of Frederick William II of Prussia
- August Heinrich Hermann von Dönhoff (1797–1874), Prussian diplomat
- Marion Dönhoff (1909–2002), German journalist and publisher

== Notable members of the Polish branch ==
- Ernst Magnus Dönhoff (1581–1642), voivode of Parnawa (1640–1642)
  - Ernst Denhoff, (died 1693), voivode of Malbork
    - Joanna Denhoffówna, daughter of Zofia Anna Oleśnicka h. Dębno, married to Hetman Stanisław Ernest Denhoff (1673–1728)
- Bogislaus Ernestus von Dönhoff, also called Denhoff, († 24 March 1734), married to Maria Magdalena Bielińska
- Kasper Denhoff (1587–1645), Voivode of Dorpat, Prince of the Holy Roman Empire (1627–1634), brother of the above
- Urszula Denhoff (died 1658), married to Marcin Kazimierz Kątski h. Brochwicz
- Jan Kazimierz Denhoff (1649–1697), Cardinal and Bishop of Cesena
- Stanisław Ernest Denhoff (1673–1728), Voivode of Połock (1721–1728), Field Hetman of Lithuania, 1709–1728

== Gallery ==
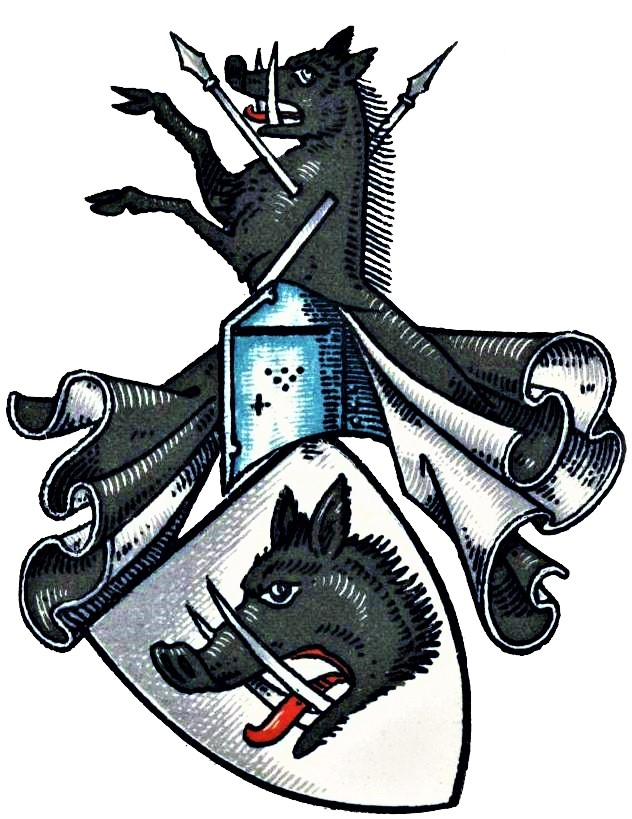
Initial Coat of arms of the family

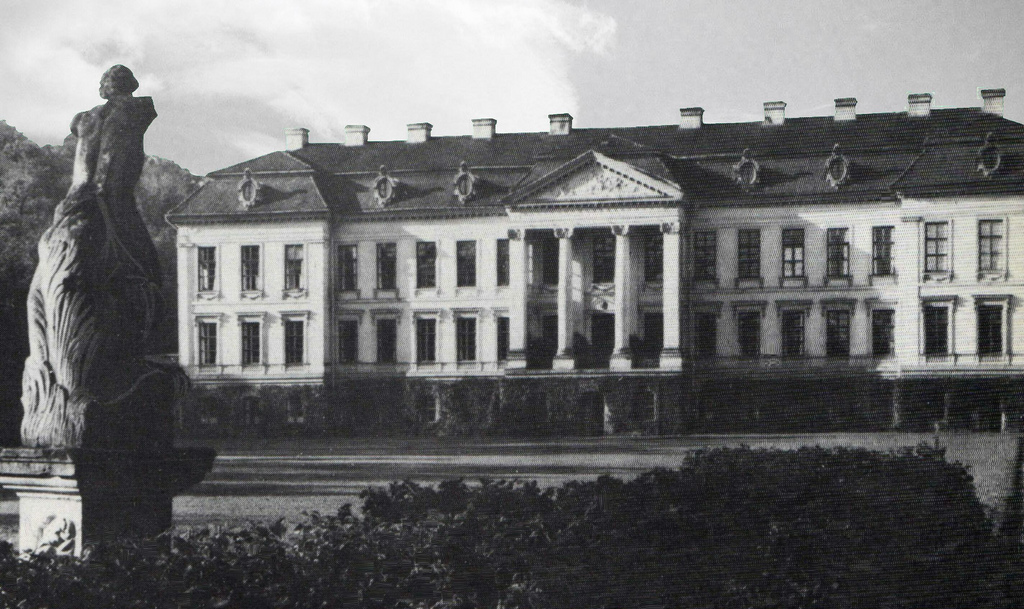
Friedrichstein Palace, 20 km east of Königsberg, burnt down by the Red Army in January 1945

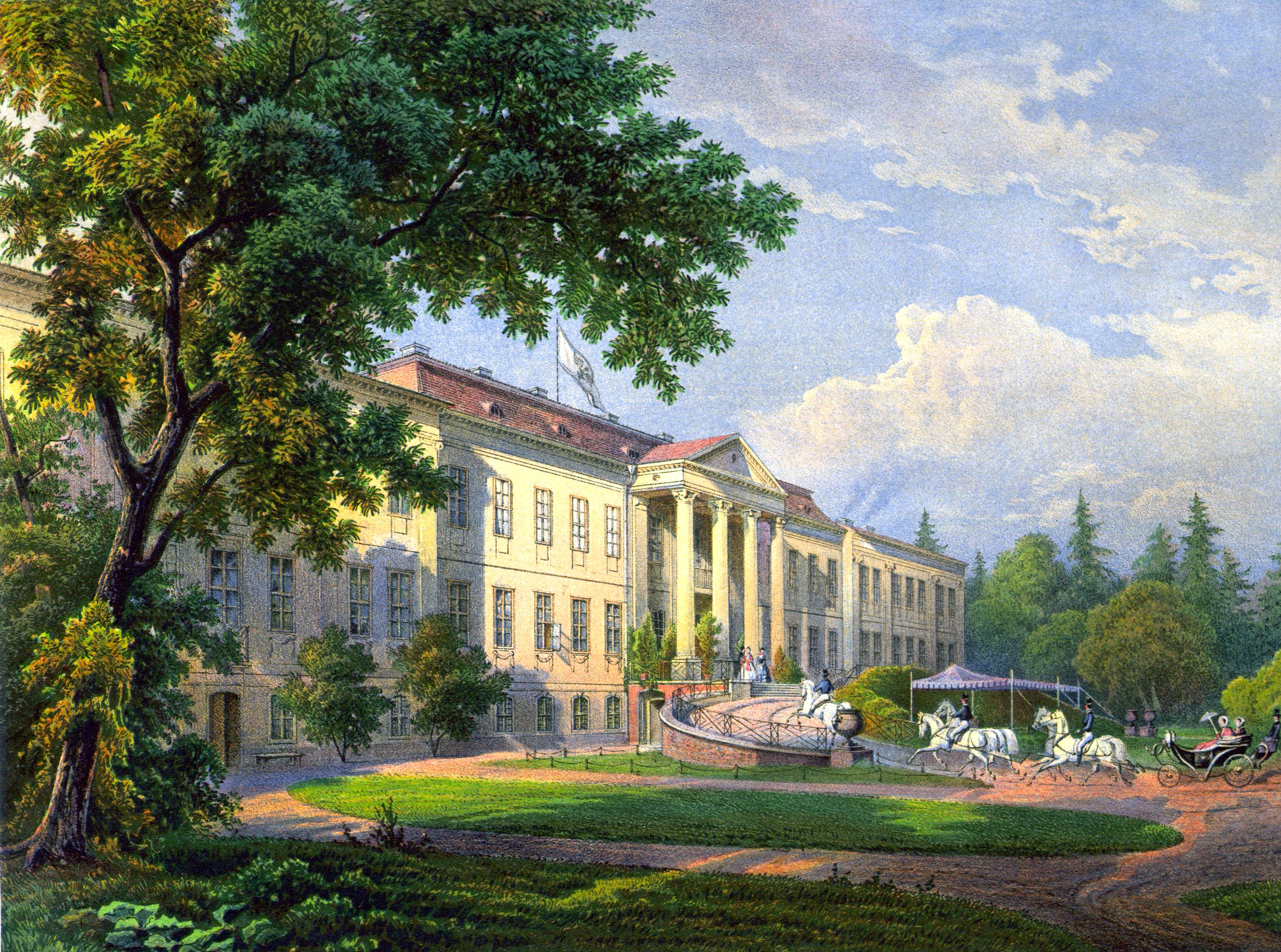
Dönhoffstädt Palace in Masuria, Poland

== See also ==
- Denhoff (surname)
- Denykhivka
