= Ernst Magnus Dönhoff =

Ernst Magnus von Dönhoff
- Reichsgraf
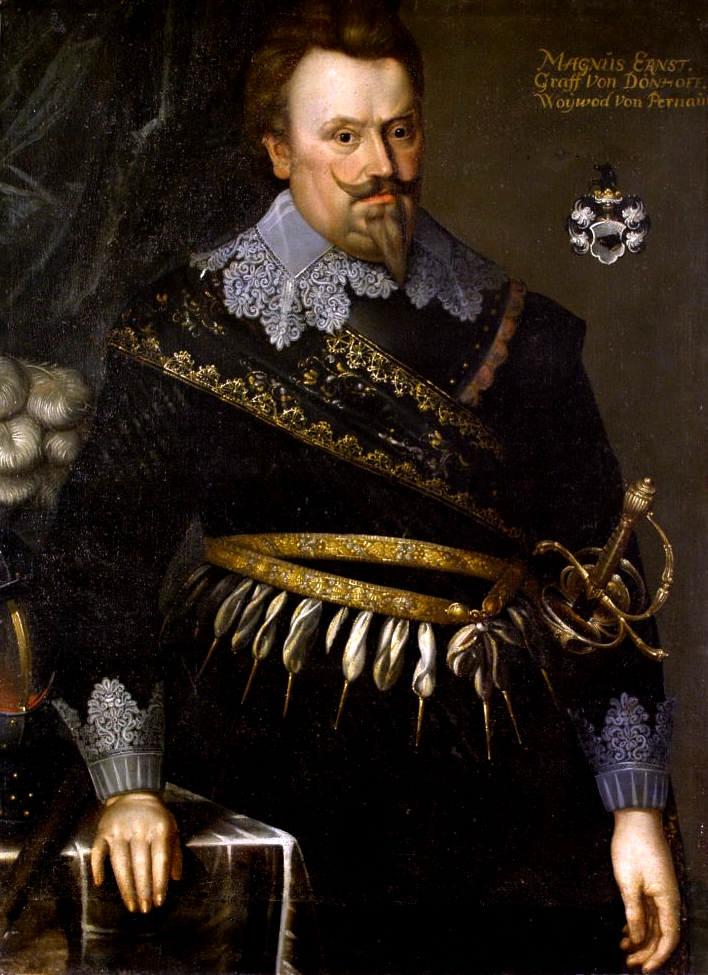
- Ernst Magnus Dönhoff
- Born: 1581
- Died: 1642 (aged 60–61); Elbing (Elbląg), Royal Prussia, Polish–Lithuanian Commonwealth
- Wife: Katharina zu Dohna
- Occupation: Castellan of Pärnu (Parnawa); Voivode of Parnawa; Starost of Tartu (Derpsk); Starost of Telšiai (Telszew); Starost of Waldau

Ernst Magnus von Dönhoff (Polish: Ernest Magnus Denhoff; 1581–1642) was a Baltic German who served the Polish–Lithuanian Commonwealth in Livonia and the Polish fief of Duchy of Prussia, and in the Swedish army during the Thirty Years' War. He was born a member of the Dönhoff family, a noble family of Prussian origin (the German family name is Dönhoff).

Always referred to as Magnus Ernst by Marion Gräfin Dönhoff, who wrote an extensive genealogy and history study of all the family branches, Magnus Ernst Dönhoff was the founder of the eastern Prussian line of the Dönhoff family. He came from Livonia and for services to George William, Elector of Brandenburg, he established his residence in Waldau near Königsberg. He was the brother of Gerhard Dönhoff and Kaspar von Dönhoff. He was married to Countess Katharina zu Dohna; they had four children. Three of their sons were born at Waldau.

Dönhoff was castellan of Pärnu (Parnawa) from 1635, voivode of Parnawa from 1640, starost of Tartu (Derpsk), Telšiai (Telszew) and of Waldau in the Pregolya River valley in Duchy of Prussia.

Dönhoff belonged to the commission which from 1625 worked for a peace agreement between Sweden and Poland. He was also instrumental in the negotiations at the peace of Altmark and at Sztumska Wieś. Dönhoff became Count (Reichsgraf) of the Holy Roman Empire since 1633. His son Friedrich Graf Dönhoff, born in Waldau in 1639, took up service for the Brandenburg electoral court.

== Bibliography ==
- Kilian Heck/Christian Thielemann (Hrsg.): Friedrichstein. Das Schloß der Grafen von Dönhoff in Ostpreußen. Deutscher Kunstverlag, München/Berlin 2006, ISBN 3-422-06593-8
- Genealogisches Handbuch der baltischen Ritterschaften, vol 2, 1: Estland, Görlitz, 1930, p. 41
- Kamila Wróblewska, Franciszek Sokołowski, Ikonografia rodziny Doenhoffów w zbiorach muzeów polskich, Rocznik Olsztyński vol. XVI, Olsztyn 1989, p. 301, 325-326, rev. 23 [ISSN 0080-3537]
