= Baranów Sandomierski =

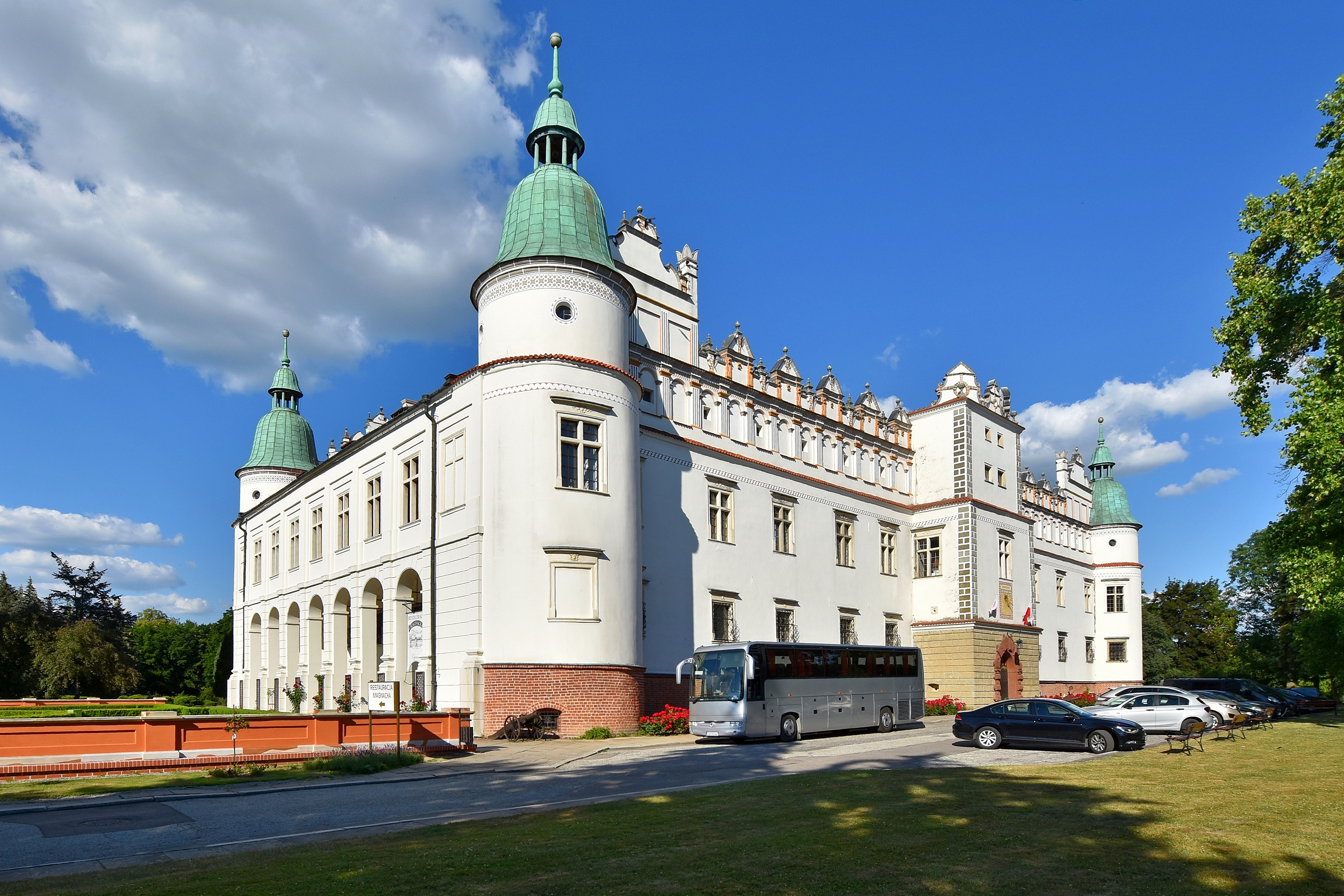
- Baranów Sandomierski Castle

- Coat of arms

- Location within Poland
- Coordinates: 50°30′N 21°32′E
- Country: Poland
- Voivodeship: Subcarpathian
- County: Tarnobrzeg
- Gmina: Baranów Sandomierski

Government
  - Mayor: Marek Mazur

Area
  - Total: 9.15 km^{2} (3.53 sq mi)

Population (31 December 2021)
  - Total: 1,420
  - Density: 155/km^{2} (400/sq mi)
- Time zone: UTC+1 (CET)
  - Summer (DST): UTC+2 (CEST)
- Postal code: 39-450
- Area code: +48 15
- Car plates: RTA
- Website: https://baranowsandomierski.pl/

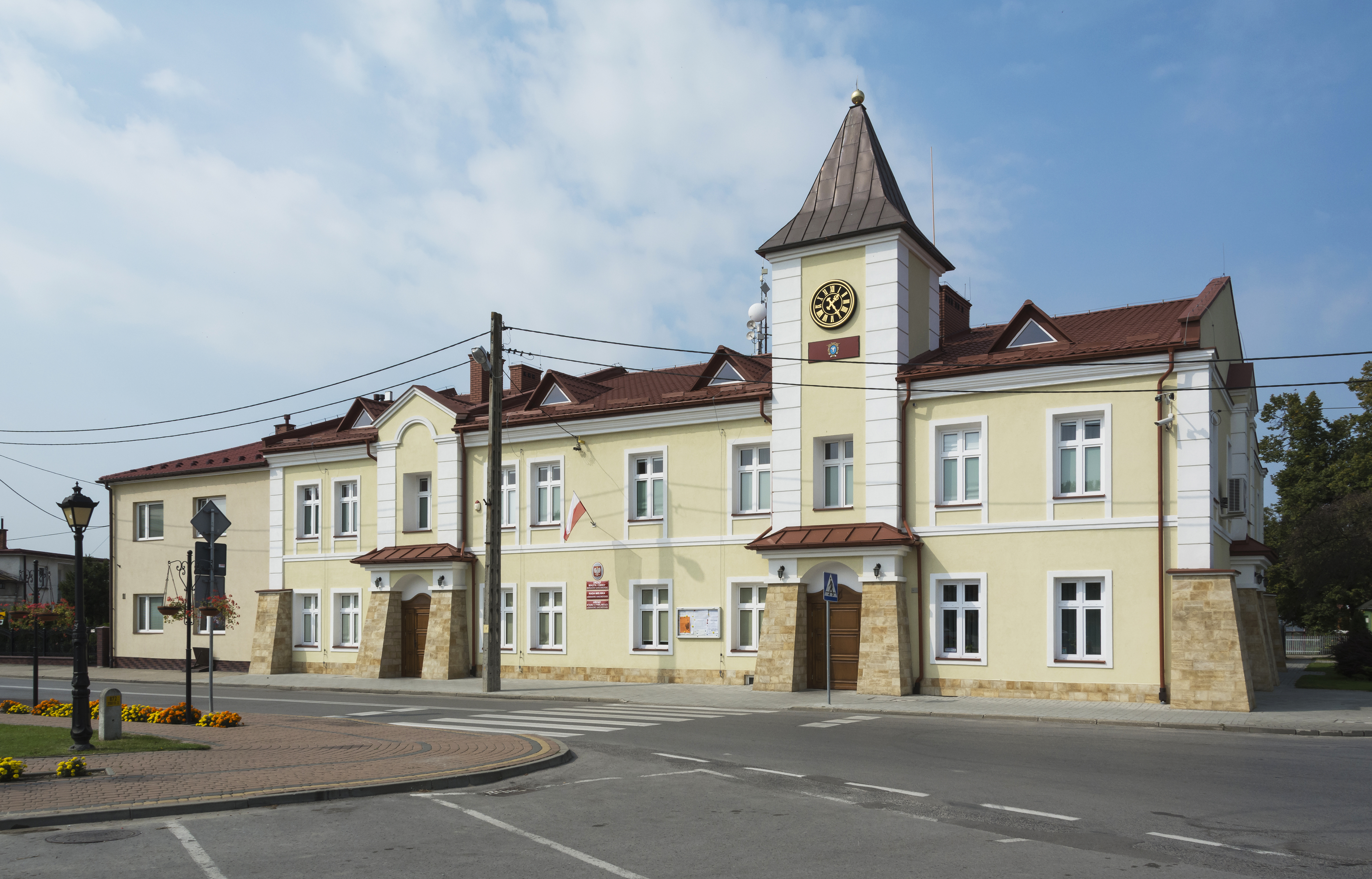
Town hall

Baranów Sandomierski [baˈranuf sandɔˈmʲɛrskʲi] is a town in southern Poland, in the Subcarpathian Voivodship, Tarnobrzeg County on the Vistula River, with 1,420 inhabitants as of December 2021. Baranów lies near the Vistula river, along voivodeship road nr. 985, which goes from Tarnobrzeg to Mielec. It belongs to the historic province of Lesser Poland, and for centuries was part of the Sandomierz Voivodeship. Its name comes either from sheep husbandry, which was prevalent in this area in the past (baran means ram in Polish), or from the Baranowski family, owners of the town.

== History ==
The settlement or the gord of Baranów was first mentioned in 1135. It was conveniently located near the Vistula river ford, and in 1354 it was granted town charter by King Casimir III the Great. Baranów belonged to the Baranowski family, and in the late 15th century it became the property of the Kurozwecki family. In 1518 Barbara Kurozwecka married Stanisław Górka, so Baranów remained in the hands of the Górka family until 1560, when it was sold to Rafał Leszczyński. During the Protestant Reformation, Baranów was an important center of Calvinism. The town prospered due to grain trade, as well as its artisans. Its decline began during the catastrophic Swedish invasion of Poland (1655–1660), when Baranów was ransacked and burned.

In 1677 the town was sold to Dymitr Wiśniowiecki, later on it belonged to the Lubomirski family, and the Potocki family. In the mid-18th century its population was ca. 1,200. After the partitions of Poland, Baranów found itself in the Austrian province of Galicia, where it remained from 1772 until 1918. The town further declined, as it was located near the tightly sealed Austrian–Russian border. Furthermore, frequent Vistula floods caused extensive damages, and on 24 August 1898 almost the whole town burned in a fire. Its decline was so severe that Baranów lost its town charter in 1896, remaining a village until 1934.

In the Second Polish Republic, Baranów became part of Tarnobrzeg County, Lwów Voivodeship. In 1933, Baranów received its coat of arms. During the 1939 Invasion of Poland, units of the Kraków Army withdrew eastwards in the area of Baranów.

Throughout its occupation in Poland, the Baranów Castle was the seat of a local German administrative office. In June 1942, the German occupiers established the Baranów Ghetto, relocating over two thousand Jewish people from the city, Tarnobrzeg, and the surrounding villages. The next month, in July, the ghetto was liquidated, with the Jewish inhabitants being forcefully relocated to a ghetto in Dębica. About 60 people would be shot during this relocation.

Before World War II, around 1500 Jews lived in the town, however, most of them were murdered in the Holocaust.

In July 1944, units of the Red Army crossed the Vistula near the town, creating the so-called Baranów Bridgehead (see Vistula–Oder Offensive).

Between 1975 and 1998, the town belonged to the Tarnobrzeg Voivodeship.

== Castle ==
The town is well known for its picturesque Renaissance castle/palace built in 1591–1606.

It is known as "little Wawel". This castle is a class zero monument. It is believed to be the work of the famous architect, Santi Gucci, the court artist of King Sigismund II Augustus, who brought many foreign architects from around Europe to Poland in the 16th century. The castle was built around 1591–1606 for Rafał and Andrzej Leszczyński. Its style comes from the Italian renaissance. By the end of the 17th century, the next owners were the Lubomirski family, who decided to change the residence. They hired a Dutch architect, who added columns on the inside of the castle courtyard, on which there was a gallery of art by Giovanni Battista (unfortunately all the art was destroyed in two fires in 1848 and 1898).

== See also ==
- List of cities and towns in Poland
