= Stanisław Ernest Denhoff =

Polish–Lithuanian noble (c. 1673 – 1728)

- Field Hetman of Lithuania
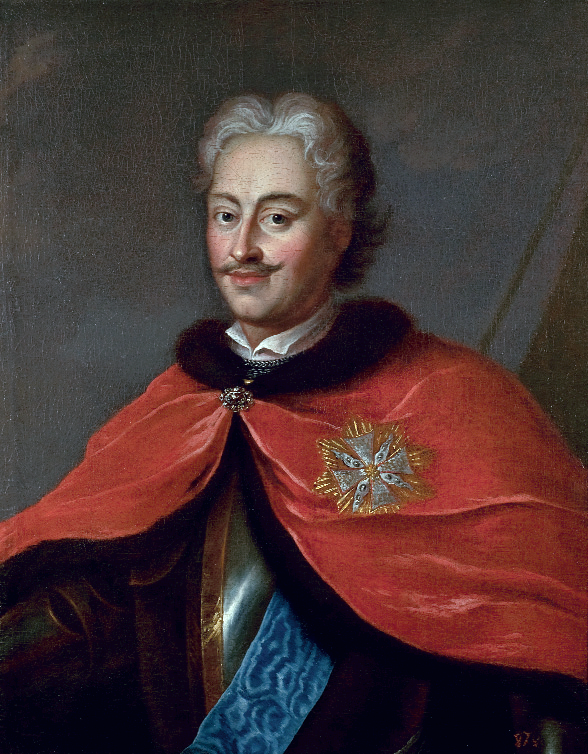
- Portrait by Ádám Mányoki, after 1713

- Coat of arms: Denhoff
- Born: c. 1673; Kościerzyna, Polish–Lithuanian Commonwealth
- Died: 2 August 1728; Danzig (Gdańsk), Polish–Lithuanian Commonwealth
- consort: Joanna Denhoffówna h. Denhoff; Maria Zofia Sieniawska h. Leliwa
- Issue: Konstancja Denhoff (first marriage)
- Father: Władysław Denhoff h. Denhof
- Mother: Konstancja Słuszczanka h. Ostoja

Stanisław Michał Ernest Denhoff (German: Dönhoff; Latin: Stanislaus Michael Ernest Denhoff; c. 1673 – 2 August 1728) was a Polish–Lithuanian aristocrat, Grand Master of the Hunt of Lithuania (from 1697), Grand Chorąży of the Crown (1704–1721), voivode of Połock (1721–1728), politician and a military commander (Field Hetman of Lithuania, 1709–1728).

He was starost of numerous territories (nowokorczyński, kałuski, kościerski, lubocheński, mozyrski, latowicki, lucyński, zydekański).

== Biography ==
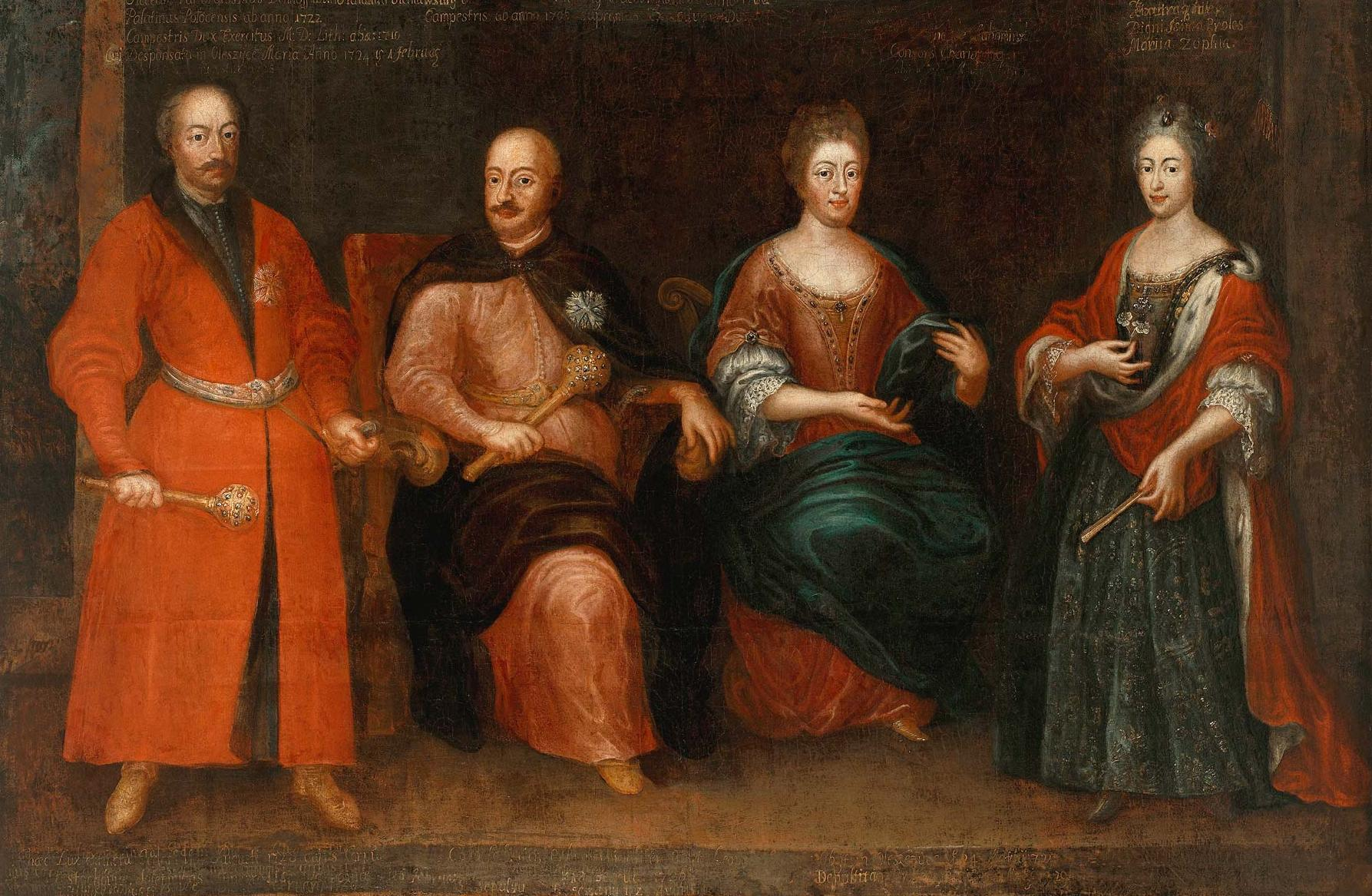
The Sieniawski family with Stanisław Ernest Denhoff on the left side.

He was born a member of the Denhoff family, a Polish–Lithuanian Commonwealth noble family of the Baltic German origin (the German family name was Dönhoff). His place of birth was Kościerzyna (Berent), Poland, in the region of Royal Prussia.

He was Grand Master of the Hunt of Lithuania since 1697. He was one of the organizers and a marshal of the Sandomierz Confederation in 1704, which supported the election of Augustus II the Strong (Augustus II of Poland) to the Polish throne. In recognition of his support he became a Grand Chorąży of the Crown in 1704, and a knight of the Order of the White Eagle, that honor awarded to him in 1705 by Augustus II. He remained an Augustus' supporter even during his short abdication, and after his return, he received further royal favors. In 1709 he received the office of the Field Hetman of Lithuania. That year, he was also one of the participants of the Battle of Poltava. In 1710 he served as the Sejm Marshal and presided over the General Council of Warsaw that confirmed Augustus II as the king. He also served as the Marshal of the Sejms on 5–19 April 1712 and 31 December 1712 – 21 February 1713 in Warsaw. In 1717 however he joined the opposition against Augustus, dissatisfied with the resolutions of the Sejm Niemy which reduced the power of the hetmans. He was the voivode of the Połock Voivodship since 1721.

He died on 2 August 1728, and was buried in Częstochowa.

== Marriage and issue ==
Stanisław Michał married Joanna Denhoffówna h. Denhof in 1709 and Countess Maria Zofia Sieniawska h. Leliwa in 1724 and had one daughter:

- Konstancja Denhoff (died 1791), married Józef Rogaliński h. Łodzia and Prince Janusz Aleksander Sanguszko h. Lis in 1731

== Bibliography ==
- Opis historyczny parafii i miasta Staszów do 1918 r.. Staszów: Parafia Rzymsko-Katolicka, 1990.
- Polski Słownik Biograficzny t. 5 s. 115
