= Helena Tekla Lubomirska =

Polish noblewoman (died 1687)

- Princess
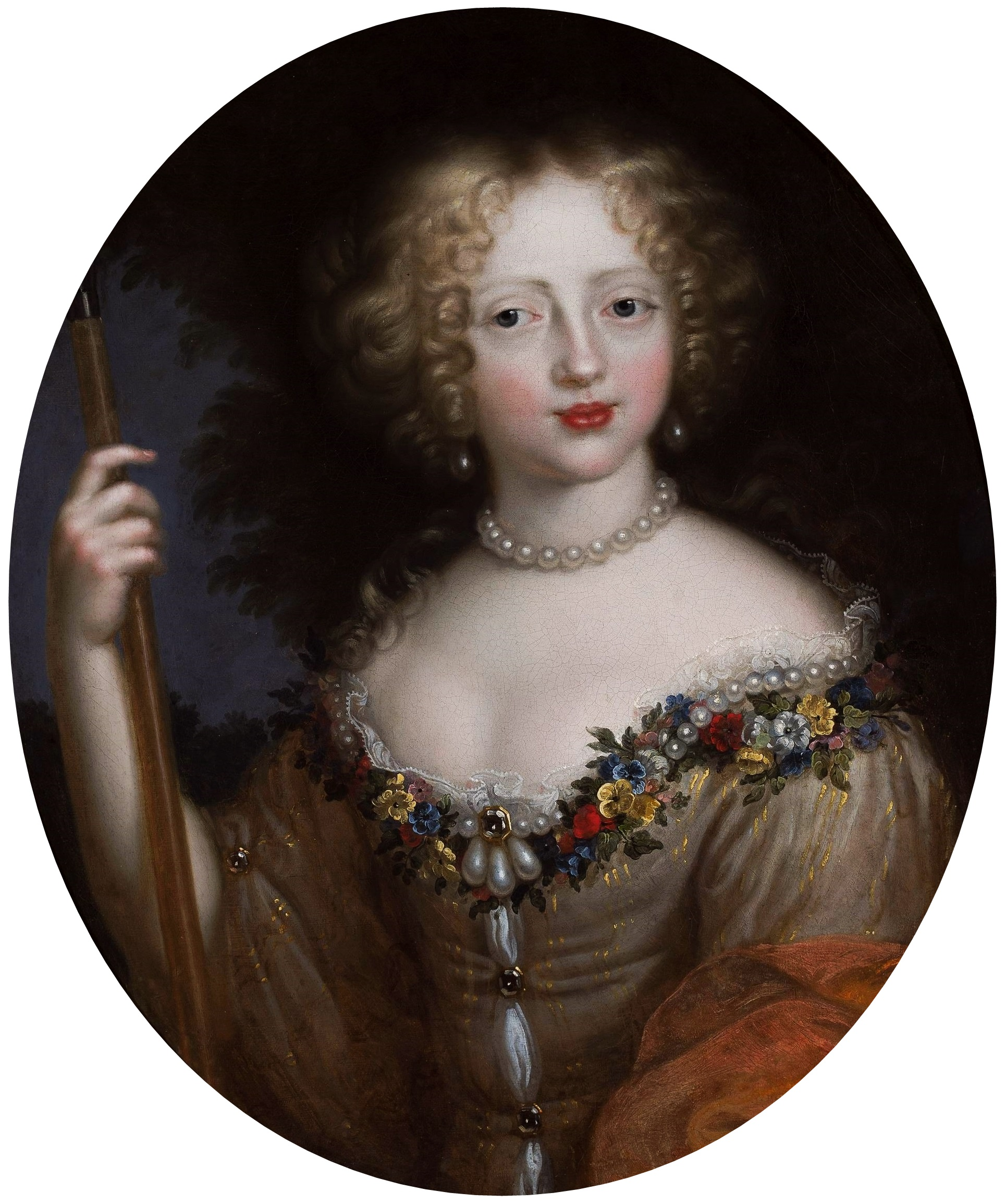
- Helena Tekla Lubomirska as Flora, painted by Nicolas Mignard (1660s)
- Full name: Helena Tekla Lubomirska née Ossolińska
- Died: 1687
- Family: Ossoliński
- Husband: Aleksander Michał Lubomirski
- Issue: Józef Karol Lubomirski
- Father: Jerzy Ossoliński
- Mother: Izabela Daniłowicz

Princess Helena Tekla Lubomirska née Ossolińska (died 1687) was a Polish noblewoman, wife of Aleksander Michał Lubomirski since 1637.

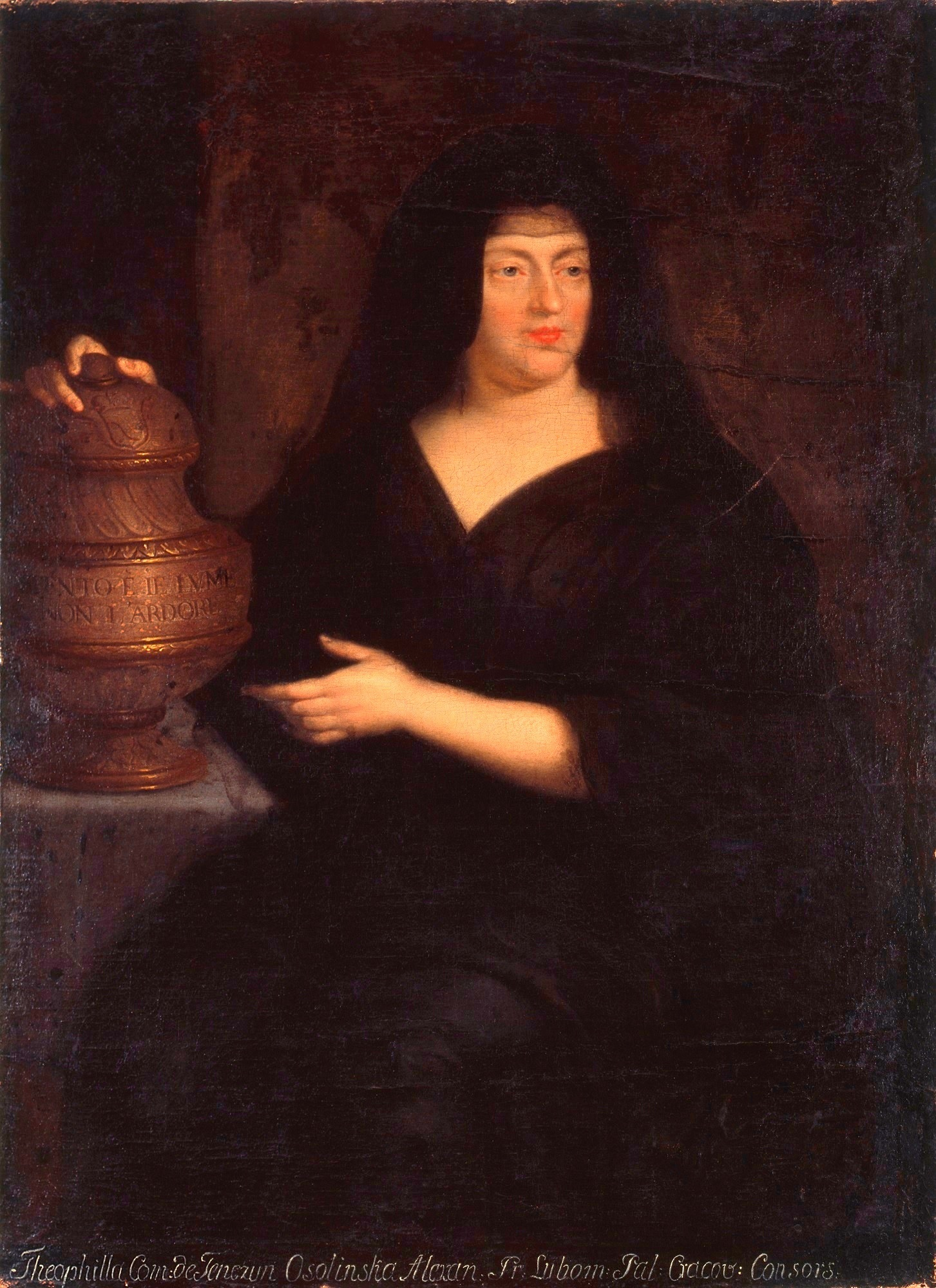
Helena Tekla Lubomirska as Pandora by Claude Callot (ca. 1677)
