= Alexander von Dönhoff =

German general (1683–1742)

Alexander Graf von Dönhoff (9 February 1683 – 9 October 1742) was a Prussian lieutenant-general and confidant of King Friedrich Wilhelm I.

He was born in Königsberg, the son of Friedrich von Dönhoff and Eleonore Katharina née von Schwerin, daughter of Otto von Schwerin, the President of the Elector of Brandenburg's Privy Council. In November 1699 he became enlisted in Brandenburg services. Then he went to Hesse-Kassel, where he was captain and in 1701 participated in the War of Spanish Succession against France. He was promoted to major in 1704, to 9nd lieutenant colonel in February 1705, and engaged in combat in northern Italy in 1706 and 1707. On 27 December 1709 he became a colonel, and led a separate regiment in 1720 and became major general on 13 July 1722, in the Prussian service. In the trial against the Prussian Crown Prince Frederick and Hans Hermann von Katte 1730, he was a member of the war court. In the years 1734 and 1735 he led the campaign on the Rhine, and on 7 June 1737 was promoted to lieutenant general. On 24 June 1740 he retired from active service.

On 31 October 1720 he married Charlotte Gräfin von Blumenthal (died 28 September 1761 in Berlin, the daughter of a Prussian Supreme Lord), and they had two sons and a daughter. His son, Friedrich Ludwig Graf von Dönhoff (born 10 February 1724 - 19 June 1778) was also major-general.

The Dönhoffplatz in Berlin-Mitte is named after him.

== Literature ==
- Kurt von Priesdorff (Hg.): Soldatisches Führertum. Hanseatische Verl.-Anst., Hamburg [1937], Band 1, Nr. 216
- Anton Balthasar König: Biographisches Lexikon aller Helden und Militärpersonen, welche sich in preussischen Diensten berühmt gemacht haben, [Wever], Berlin 1788–1791, Nachdruck: LTR-Verlag, Starnberg 1989, ISBN 3-88706-305-8
