= Janusz Aleksander Sanguszko =

Court Marshal of Lithuania

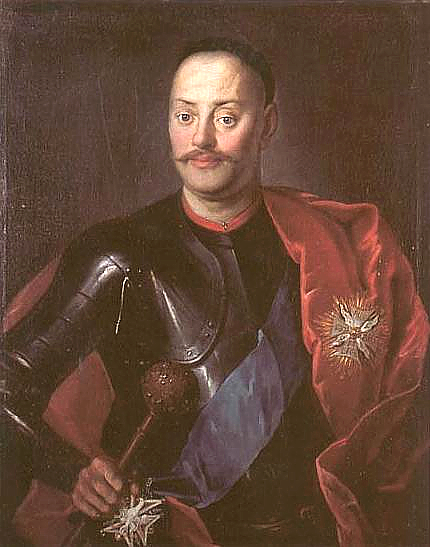

Janusz Aleksander Sanguszko (Lithuanian: Jonušas Aleksandras Sanguška; 5 May 1712, Lubartów – 14 September 1775, Dubno) was a magnate in the Polish–Lithuanian Commonwealth. He held the titles of miecznik and Court Marshal of Lithuania.

He was not interested in politics, and spent most of his life using the fortunes previous members of the Sanguszko family gathered, spending it on his lavish lifestyle. Indebted, in 1753, he agreed to divide the ordynacja ostrogoska he inherited from his mother, Marianna Lubomirska, among the members and allies of the familia. This decision, known as the transakcja kolbuszowska, was opposed by the enemy of familia, hetman Jan Klemens Branicki, and was finally accepted by the decision of Sejm (national parliament) in 1766. He married Konstancja Sanguszko in 1731 but separated after the wedding. He had affair with his secretary Kazimierz Chyliński.
