= Parnawa Voivodeship =

Voivodship of Polish-Lithuanian Commonwealth

Coordinates: 58°23′00″N 24°30′00″E

Parnawa Voivodeship Województwo parnawskie
- Voivodeship of Livonia^{1}
- 1598–1621
- Coat of arms

- Parnawa Voivodeship in the Duchy of Livonia.
- Capital: Parnawa
- Area
- 12,000 km^{2} (4,600 sq mi)
- History
  - Established: 1598
  - Polish–Swedish War: 1621
Succeeded by
Swedish Livonia
- ^{1} The Duchy of Livonia was a vassal to the Grand Duchy of Lithuania until the Union of Lublin in 1569, and after that a part of the Polish–Lithuanian Commonwealth.

The Parnawa Voivodeship (Polish: Województwo parnawskie) was a unit of administrative division and local government in the Duchy of Livonia, part of the Polish–Lithuanian Commonwealth, since it was formed in 1598 until the Swedish conquest of Livonia in the 1620s. The seat of the voivode was Parnawa (Pärnu).

The voivodeship was created by King Zygmunt III Waza, and it was based on the Parnawa Presidency, created by King Stefan Batory in 1582, after the Truce of Yam-Zapolsky. It effectively ceased to exist in 1621, but officially, Parnawa Voivodeship existed until the Treaty of Oliva (1660). Its main towns were: Parnawa, Felin, Wolmar, Karkus, Salis, Lemsal, and Helme.

The title of Voivode of Parnawa, as well as other local titles, remained in use until the Partitions of Poland. It was one of the so-called fictitious titles (Polish: urzad fikcyjny).

== Titular voivodes ==
The voivodes of Dorpat Voivodeship:

1. Ernst Magnus Dönhoff
2. Piotr Tryzna
3. Jan Zawadzki
4. Gothard Tyzenhaus
5. Henryk Doenhoff
