= Aleksander Michał Lubomirski (died 1677) =

Polish nobleman

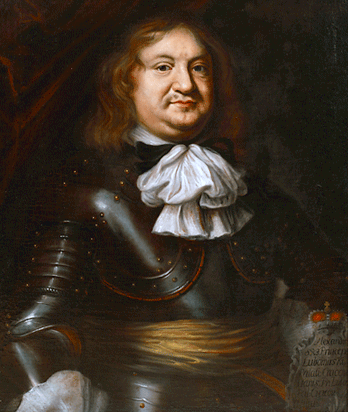

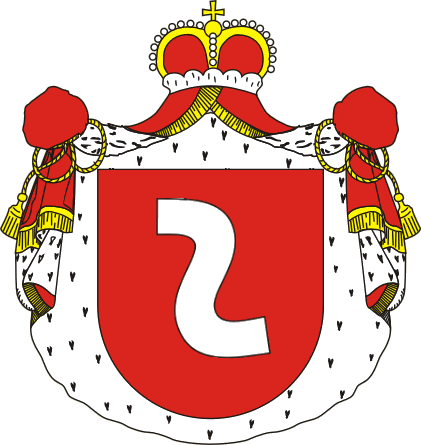
- Coat of arms: Lubomirski
- Born: 1614
- Died: 1677 (aged 62–63)
- Family: Lubomirski
- Wife: Helena Tekla Ossolińska
- Issue: Józef Karol Lubomirski
- Father: Stanisław Lubomirski
- Mother: Zofia Ostrogska

Prince Aleksander Michał Lubomirski (1614 – 8 December 1677) was a Polish nobleman, aristocrat and the brother of controversial commander Jerzy Sebastian Lubomirski.

Lubomirski was the Deputy Cup-Bearer of the Queen from 1643 and Master of the Horse of the Polish Crown from 1645. In 1668 he became the Governor of Kraków Voivodeship, prior to being Starost of Sandomierz and Bydgoszcz.

He was owner of two castles (Wiśnicz and Rzemień), three towns, 120 villages, 57 folwarks and 7 starostwos.

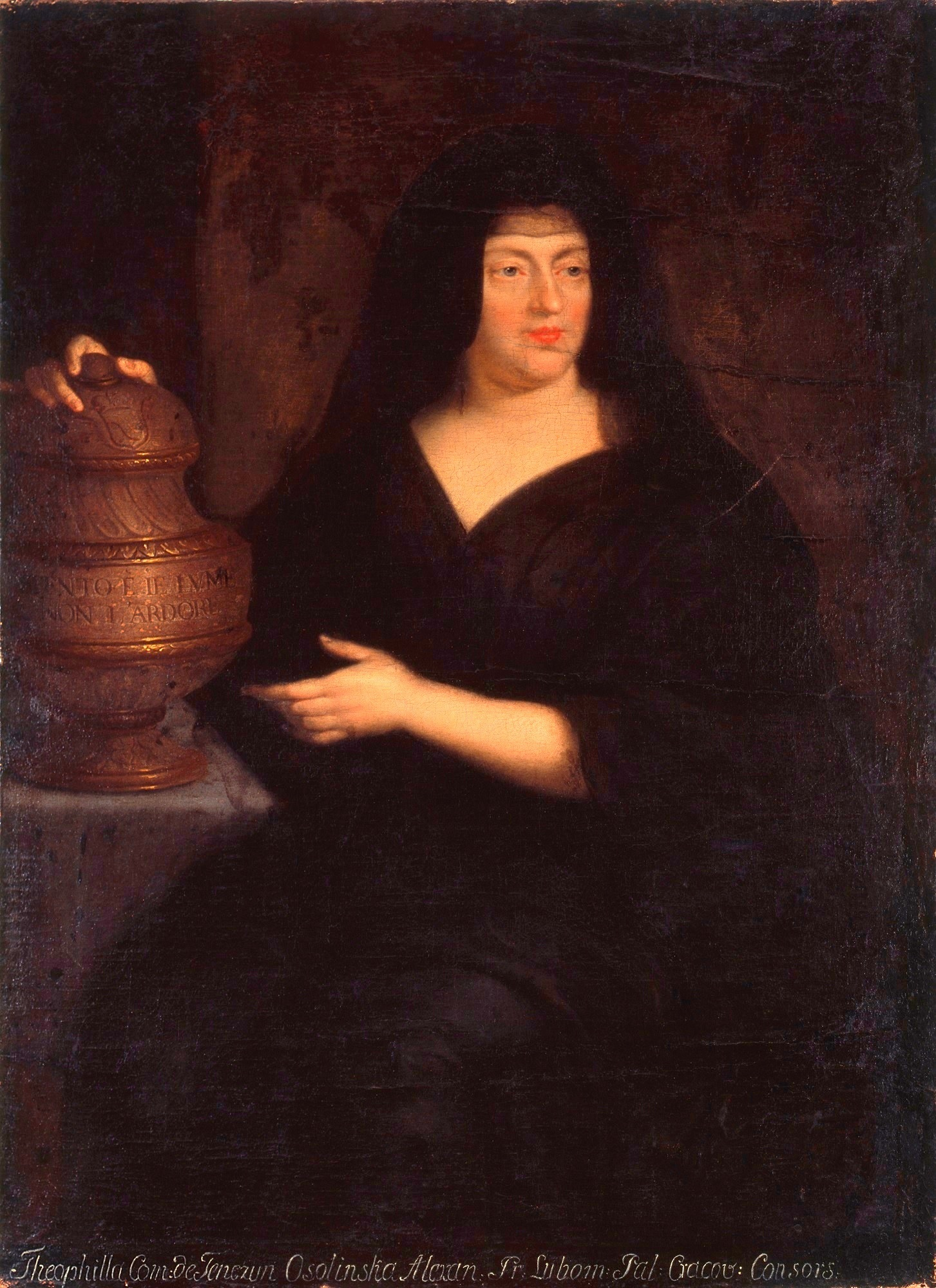
Claude Callot, Helena Tekla Ossolińska as Pandora, ca. 1677
