= Karl Konrad Graf von der Groeben =

German businessman

Karl Konrad Wilhelm Alexander Graf von der Groeben-Ponarien (31 August 1918 in Königsberg – 6 July 2005 in Baden-Baden) was a German entrepreneur.

== Early life ==
His family came from East Prussia. In World War II, he was linked to the anti-Hitler resistance of the 20 July plot.

== Career ==
After the war, he acquired a distributor's license from the Coca-Cola Company. Through the Freudenberg Foundation, with which he was closely associated, he met the initiators of the later Amadeu Antonio Foundation.

In 1991, Graf laid down DM250,000 to establish the Amadeu Antonio Foundation to oppose far-right-wing parties, racism and anti-Semitism. It was named for Amadeu Antonio, an Angolan Vertragsarbeiter (contract worker) who was the first victim of racially motivated violence after German reunification.
