= Amadeu Antonio =

Angolan victim of far-right violence (1962–1990)

- Born: 12 August 1962; Quimbele, Uíge Province, Angola
- Died: 6 December 1990 (aged 28); Eberswalde, Brandenburg, Germany
- Cause of death: Homicide by beating
- Occupation: Butcher
- Partner: Gabriele Schimansky
- Children: 1

Amadeu António (12 August 1962 – 6 December 1990) was an Angolan man who was murdered as one of the first known victims of far-right racist violence in reunified Germany. The verdicts reached during the course of the trial of the murderers were widely criticised as being too lax, as the court had sentenced them to four years in prison for bodily injury that resulted in death (Körperverletzung mit Todesfolge). Much of public opinion and the media had called for homicide charges to be filed. The Amadeu Antonio Foundation was founded in his memory in 1998.

== Biography ==
Antonio was born in 1962 in the town of Quimbele, in Uíge Province, northeast of the capital Luanda, as the oldest of 12 children to Helena Alfonso and Antonio Makeueng. His father was a government employee, who worked closely with the mayor of Quimbele during the Portuguese administration. Despite the Angolan War of Independence during his childhood, Antonio's upbringing was described as peaceful, living in a tight-knit neighbourhood with relatives and receiving a European-style education, learning Portuguese in addition to his native Lingala. In 1974, following the establishment of independent Angola, Antonio was unable to continue his sixth-grade attendance at his local Portuguese-run school, moving to Luanda to take classes there while working at the photography store of his cousins. With the beginning of the Angolan Civil War the following year, he was drafted into the People's Armed Forces of Liberation of Angola as a child soldier. After spending five years in the Soviet Union to train in aircraft flight mechanics, Antonio returned to Angola to work as an aircraft mechanic in the military. He also went to Brazil as a coffee salesman and completed several training programs in Portugal and Sweden.

On 3 August 1987, he arrived in East Germany along with 103 other Angolans as Vertragsarbeiter. He had hoped to study aeronautic technology, but as with many Angolan foreign workers at that time, he became a butcher for EWG Eberswalder Wurst, part of the Schlacht- und Verarbeitungskombinat in Eberswalde, Brandenburg, where he met his girlfriend. The status of the relationship, while anticipating a child in 1990, changed abruptly amidst German reunification as many of the Vertragsarbeiter lost their jobs and their residency authorization was in limbo due to the cancelling of contracts made with their home countries. He had told his family that he planned to return to Angola once his child was born.

Antonio is sometimes given the full name "Amadeu Antonio Kiowa", though family and friends confirmed that Antonio never used "Kiowa" in private or documentation. The name first appeared in the 1992 and 1995 Human Rights Watch reports on his murder, with additional uses in-between by the newspapers Die Tageszeitung and Die Zeit as well as Konstantin Wecker's commemorative song about Antonio. Neves Quitando, a friend and colleague of Antonio, stated that "Kiowa" was a positive word for "alone" in Kimbundu, which Antonio was not a speaker of. The "Kiowa" byname reappeared in the mid-2000s, becoming commonly used by public broadcasting, which were used as sources to occasionally edit the name on the German Wikipedia page of Antonio.

=== Murder ===
On the night of 24 November 1990, far-right skinheads from various cities grouped together at the apartment of a neo-Nazi in Eberswalde. They came together with 50 other people at a nightclub to "slap Negroes" (Neger klatschen), according to one of the participants in the trial. The following night, the skinheads encountered Antonio and two Mozambican men. Antonio was brutally beaten by the neo-Nazis. One of the perpetrators jumped with both feet onto Antonio's head as he laid on the ground. Antonio suffered fatal injuries to the head. He never recovered from the resulting coma and died eleven days after, as a result of the attack. The two men that were with Antonio were attacked with knives, with them escaping, but with serious injuries.

During the incident, twenty police officers, in full equipment, remained at a short distance, without intervening. Three armed civil police officers that accompanied the group also did not intervene. One of the police officers said that he went back with his two colleagues because "he had wanted to avoid having problems with the group". In 1994, the District Court of Frankfurt (Oder) rejected the accusation against the police officers for Körperverletzung mit Todesfolge durch Unterlassen (Bodily injury that resulted in death by omission).

=== Trial ===
Six of the perpetrators had criminal cases processed against them. The International Court of Justice in Geneva sent an observer, fearing that the victim would be seen as responsible and the perpetrators would be let go with impunity. The sentences were reached just based on the testimony of an accomplice that initially refused to testify, but after gave in after a confidentiality agreement.

In 1992, the district court of Frankfurt (Oder) sentenced five of those involved to a maximum of four years in prison for bodily injury that caused death, and some with suspended sentences. It was not possible to determine who dealt the fatal blows. The other 21 participants who were on trial were not imprisoned.

The sentences were widely criticised by public opinion. The Commissary of Foreign Businesses of Brandenburg, Almuth Berger, feared that such sentences could be interpreted as an "encouragement of xenophobic attacks". The Minister of Justice of the state of Rhineland-Palatinate, Peter Caesar, warned that acts of violence against foreign citizens are not instances of "juvenile delinquency".

Similarly, criminal law specialist Monika Frommel described the act as such in 1992:

When the Angolan Antonio Amadeu was killed by 'skins' in Eberswalde nearly two years ago, it became clear that the protests in East Germany were not just a form of juvenile disturbances.

She expressed doubts that the lawyers were really able to "judge right-wing crimes and left-wing crimes with the same criteria" and described the judiciary in Germany as a "political judiciary".

The event was classified as a murder by many outlets, including Die Welt, Der Spiegel, Die Tageszeitung, Berliner Zeitung, Norddeutscher Rundfunk, Netzeitung, Mut gegen rechte Gewalt, Netz gegen Nazis and the Amadeu Antonio Foundation.

== Homages ==
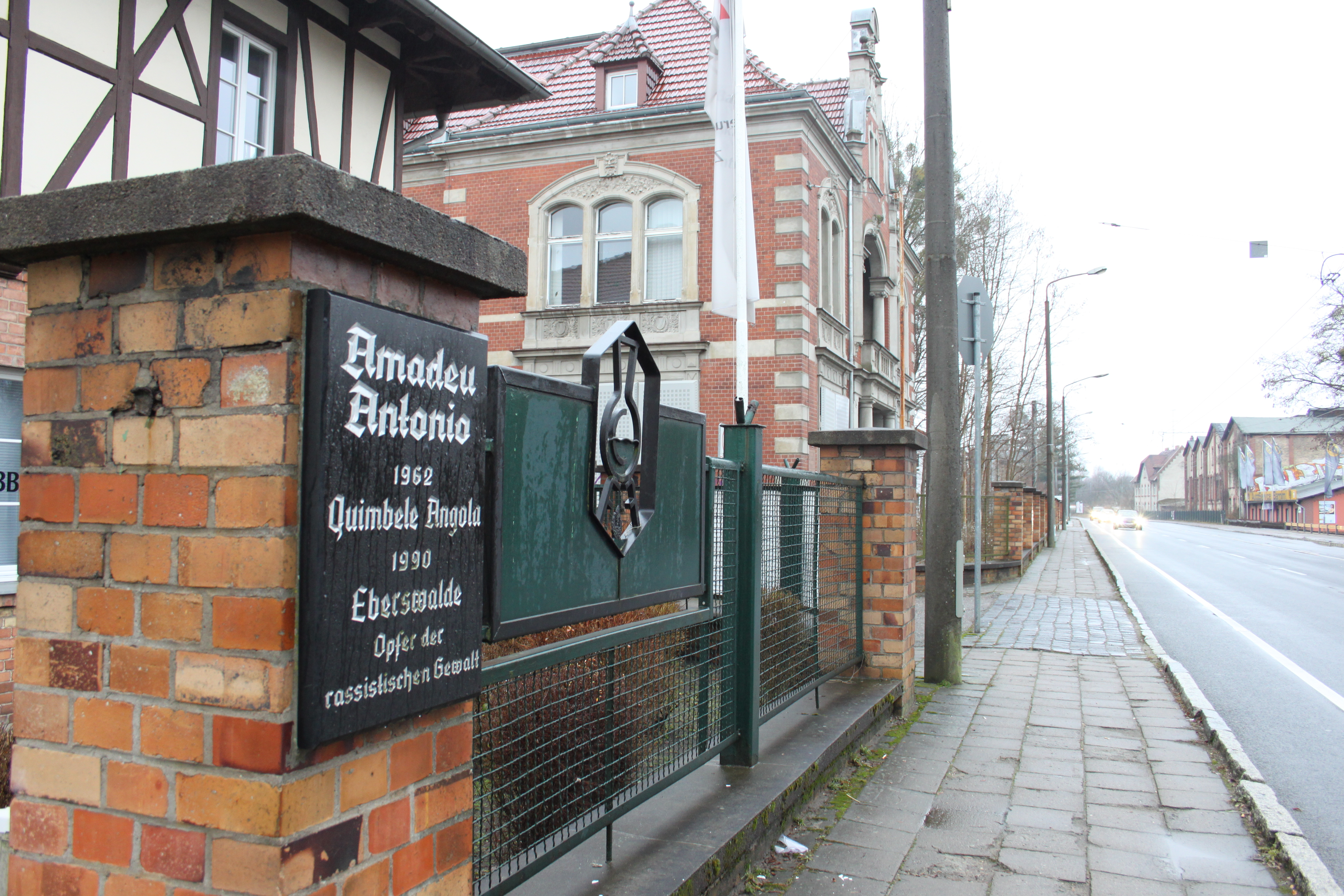
A memorial plaque on Eberswalder Strasse 24a in tribute to Antonio

Antonio and his death were memorialized in many ways. The Amadeu Antonio Foundation, in memory of Antonio, was founded in 1998 to strengthen civil society against far-right extremist violence in everyday life. Since 2007, the Barnimer initiative Light me Amadeu has organized protests and acts against xenophobia, as well as having hosted commemorative events every year on the anniversary of his death. A plaque in homage to Antonio was built at the scene of the murder. The African cultural association Palanca organized the exposition Geschichte der angolanischen Vertragarbeiter em Eberswalde ("History of contracted Angolan workers in Eberswalde"), which includes sections about Antonio.

Konstantin Wecker dedicated a ballad to Antonio with "Willy", which describes the murder and denounces xenophobia.

Since the beginning of 2012, the Light me Amadeu initiative began collecting signatures to rename the street where Antonio was killed. The decision to change the name was postponed various times by councilors in the area. Another proposal sought to name a civic education center after Antonio, as well as a civic promise award. This concept was presented and later accepted by the municipality of Eberswalde by a large margin in November 2012. The center was inaugurated on 9 August 2014. In 2022, a street in Eberswalde was renamed for Amadeu Antonio.

== Family ==
In January 1991, his body was transferred to Angola, where he was buried at Sant'Ana Cemetery in Luanda. The same day as the transfer, Antonio's pregnant companion, Gabriele Schimansky, gave birth to a son, Amadeu Antonio Schimansky.

Gabriele and her son were the targets of racist incidents in Eberswalde. Among other events, her baby carriage was painted with swastikas and afterwards was damaged beyond repair. Schimansky later married Ngoy Mukendi, a Congolese business manager from Kinshasa, adopting his last name and having three more children with him. As late as autumn 1998, the family was still frequently harassed, with three uncles surviving a stabbing, a mob beating, and a pitbull attack. The family later moved to Berlin. Gabriele died in 2015; their son Amadeu Schimansky lived in Eberswalde and played in the local football club, FV Preussen.

When Amadeu Schimansky entered schooling, local authorities began questioning the family on whether the boy was really Amadeu Antonio's biological son. Antonio's mother, Helena Alfonso, of Bakongo origin, lived in Rocha Pinto, in the Samba district of Luanda. In 2001, with the help of donations, she went with one of her children to Germany to do a blood test to confirm the paternity of Antonio and obtain compensation pension as result of her son's murder. They received 3,600 marks in donations. However, they were the victims of a robbery where US$800 was taken from them at the Friedrichstrasse rail station. A TV crew from ARD accompanied them to the blood sampling and documented the result.

Helena Alfonso received €1,500 in order to provide a proper burial for Amadeu and to repair the gravesite. The family was later given 5,000 euros after the 20th anniversary of his death in 2011 by the municipal council of Eberswalde.

== See also ==
- 1993: Amadeu Antônio. Berlinale, Cinema Forum; Germany 1992; Direction: Thomas Balzer; Distribution: ZDF.
