= International relations within the Comecon =

The "Council for Mutual Economic Assistance" (Comecon) was an economic organization of communist states, created in 1949, and dissolved in 1991, with the collapse of the Soviet Union. International relations within Comecon is best discussed under three separate categories, as the nature of the relationships between the Soviet Union and its constituent members were not homogeneous.

== The Soviet Union and Eastern Europe ==
Since Comecon's creation in 1949, the relationship between the Soviet Union and the seven East European countries had generally remained the same. The seven countries were: Albania, Bulgaria, Czechoslovakia, East Germany, Hungary, Poland, and Romania. The Soviet Union had provided fuel, non-food raw materials, airplane and helicopter designs and semi-manufactures ("hard goods") to Eastern Europe, which in turn, had supplied the Soviet Union with finished machinery, and industrial consumer goods ("soft goods").

This kind of economic relationship stemmed from a genuine economic problem within the Eastern communist states in the 1950s. Eastern Europe had poor energy and mineral resources, a problem exacerbated by the low energy efficiency of East European industry. As of mid-1985, factories in Eastern Europe still used 40% more fuel than those in the West. Eastern European countries have always relied heavily on the Soviet Union for oil. During the 1950s, Eastern Europe supplied the Soviet Union with those goods, otherwise unavailable, because of Western embargoes.

Thus, from the early 1950s to the early 1970s, the Soviet Union inexpensively supplied its East European clients with hard goods in exchange for finished machinery and equipment. Soviet economic policies also brought with them, political and military support. During these years, the Soviet Union could be assured of relative political tranquillity within the bloc, obedience in international strategy, as laid down by the Soviet Union, and military support of Soviet aims. By the 1980s, both parties were accustomed to this arrangement, which was still particularly advantageous to The Soviet Union, as it could expand its energy and raw materials complex quickly, and relatively cheaply.

In the 1970s, the terms of trade for the Soviet Union had improved. The OPEC price for oil had soared, placing the oil-rich Soviet Union in an advantageous position. The soaring price increased the cost of providing Eastern Europe with oil at prices lower than those established by OPEC. In addition, extraction and transportation costs for oil, much of which originated in Siberia, was also rising. In response to the market, the Soviet Union decreased its exports to its East European partners and increased its purchases of soft goods from these countries. This policy forced the East European countries to turn to the West for hard goods, despite the fact that they had fewer goods to export in return for hard currency.

Any hard goods supplied to Eastern Europe by the Soviet Union were sold essentially at a discount price, as Comecon prices lagged behind, and were lower than those of the world market. Developments in the 1980s made this situation even more complex. The 1983–84 decline in international oil prices left the Soviets with large holdings of oil that, because of the lag in Comecon prices, were still rising in price. The "non-market gains from preferential trade" became quite expensive for the Soviets. East European profits from the implicit subsidization were almost US$102 billion between 1971 and 1981.

== Mongolia, Cuba, and Vietnam ==
Soviet-initiated Comecon support for the Council's three least-developed members, Cuba, Mongolia, and Vietnam, benefited them, but the burden on the seven East European Comecon members had been most unwelcome. Comecon was structured in such a way that the more economically developed members provided support to the less developed members in their major economic sectors. When Mongolia initially joined the Comecon in 1962, there was no great added burden. The population of Mongolia was relatively small, and the country's subsidies came primarily from the Soviet Union. But the addition of Cuba in 1972, and Vietnam in 1978, quickly escalated this burden. As of early 1987, three-fourths of Comecon's overseas economic aid went to Cuba, Mongolia, and Vietnam: almost US$4 billion went to Cuba, US$2 billion to Vietnam (half in military aid), and US$1 billion to Mongolia.

Although the Soviets carried most of the burden since 1976, the East Europeans had been persuaded to take part in projects to boost the developing countries' economies. East European countries imported Cuban nickel, and Mongolian molybdenum and copper. They were also pressed to buy staples, such as Cuban sugar (80% of Cuba's exports), at inflated prices. Eastern Europe also contributed to the International Investment Bank, from which the underdeveloped three could acquire loans at lower interest rates than the East Europeans themselves. The Soviets also sold their fuel and raw materials to Cuba, Vietnam, and Mongolia for less than it was sold to the seven East European members. Hence, the former had become competitors for the slowly diminishing Soviet resources. In the late 1980s, the only benefit accruing to the East Europeans was the services provided by Vietnamese guest workers. However, the majority of the Vietnamese had worked primarily on the Druzhba pipeline in/between the Soviet Union and Eastern Europe.

Comecon was investing heavily in Mongolia, Cuba, and Vietnam, and the three countries had benefited substantially from its resources. In 1984, increases in capital investments within Comecon were the highest for Vietnam and Cuba — coming to 26.9% for Vietnam, and 14% for Cuba, compared with 3.3% and less, for the others, except Poland and Romania. Increased investments in Mongolia lagged behind Poland and Romania, but were nevertheless substantial, at 5.8%. In 1984, the economies of the three developing countries registered the fastest industrial growth of all the Comecon members.

Given their locations, Comecon membership for Mongolia, Cuba, and Vietnam principally served Soviet foreign policy interests. The Soviet Union contributed the most to the development of the three poorer Comecon members, and it also reaped most of the benefits. It imported most of Cuba's sugar and nickel, and all of Mongolia's copper and molybdenum (widely used in the construction of aircraft, automobiles, machine tools, gas turbines, and in the field of electronics). Cuba had provided bases for the Soviet Navy, and military support to Soviet allies in Africa. Vietnam made its naval and air bases, as well as some 100,000 guest workers, available to the Soviets. As of 1989 there were also approximately 59,000 Vietnamese guest workers in East Germany, called Vertragsarbeiter (contract workers).

At the June 1984 Comecon economic summit, and at subsequent Council sessions, the policy of equalizing the levels of economic development between Comecon member countries was repeatedly stressed. At the November 1986 Comecon session in Bucharest, the East European members "outlined measures to further improve cooperation with Vietnam, Cuba, and Mongolia with a view to developing the main sectors of these countries' national economies". Moreover, the Soviets have repeatedly stressed their earnestness in "normalizing the situation in the Asia-Pacific region, and in including that region in the overall process of creating a universal system of international security".

== Support for developing countries ==
Comecon provided economic and technical support to 34 developing countries in 1960, 62 countries in 1970, and over 100 countries in 1985. As of 1987, Comecon had assisted in the construction or preparation of over 4,000 mostly industrial projects in Asia, Latin America, and Africa. A monetary figure for this assistance was difficult to estimate, although a June 1986 Czechoslovak source valued the exchange between Comecon and developing countries at 34 billion Rbls per year, the equivalent of US$44.2 billion. The precise nature of this aid was unclear, and Western observers believe the data to be inflated.

From the 1960s to the mid-1980s, Comecon had sought to encourage the development of industry, energy, transportation, mineral resources, and agriculture of Third World countries. Comecon countries had also provided technical and economic training for personnel in Asia, Africa, and Latin America. When Comecon initially lent support to developing countries, it generally concentrated on developing those products that would support the domestic economies of the Third World, including replacements for imports. In the 1970s and 1980s, assistance from Comecon had been directed toward export-oriented industries. Third World countries had paid for this support with products, produced by the project for which Comecon rendered help. This policy had provided Comecon with a stable source of necessary deliveries, in addition to political influence in these strategically important areas.
