= Belltower.News =

German anti-fascist watchdog news website

- Editor-in-Chief: Simone Rafael
- Categories: Anti-fascist watchdog journalism
- Publisher: Amadeu Antonio Foundation
- Founder: Die Zeit
- Founded: 2007
- Based in: Berlin, Germany
- Language: German
- Website: belltower.news

Belltower.News is a German anti-fascist watchdog news website acting as the primary outlet of the Amadeu Antonio Foundation. Founded in 2007 by Die Zeit, the site was known as Netz gegen Nazis until 3 April 2017.

== History ==
Netz gegen Nazis was initiated by Giovanni di Lorenzo, the editor-in-chief of Die Zeit near the end of 2007 with the help of several other organizations such as the German Football Association, German Olympic Sports Confederation, Die Liga – Fußballverband, German Fire Brigade Association, and the ZDF. The stated aim of the website was, and still is, the combating of right-wing extremism, racism, antisemitism, as well as other forms of "group-based misanthropy".

In 2009, the website was transferred to the ownership of the Amadeu Antonio Foundation of Anetta Kahane, which has managed it since.

The name of the website was changed to Belltower.News – Netz für digitale Zivilgesellschaft on 3 April 2017.

== Criticism ==
In a 2008 article, Die Welt journalist Thomas Lindemann criticized the project and its success, alleging that it might be counterproductive.

Parts of the German left have criticized Belltower.News for presenting critiques of Israeli politics as antisemitic. This has also lead some to categorize the website as a part of the Anti-German current.

Some conservatives and right-wingers have frequently criticized Belltower.News for covering them instead of actual neo-nazis. Die Achse des Guten for example, wrote in a 2017 article: "As the publishers of [Belltower.News] have noticed, there are barely any "Nazis"; they are politically marginalized. The real enemy is the center of society, the liberal and conservative citizenry, or rather what is still left of it."
