= Amadeu Antonio Foundation =

German anti-racist organization

- Amadeu Antonio Stiftung

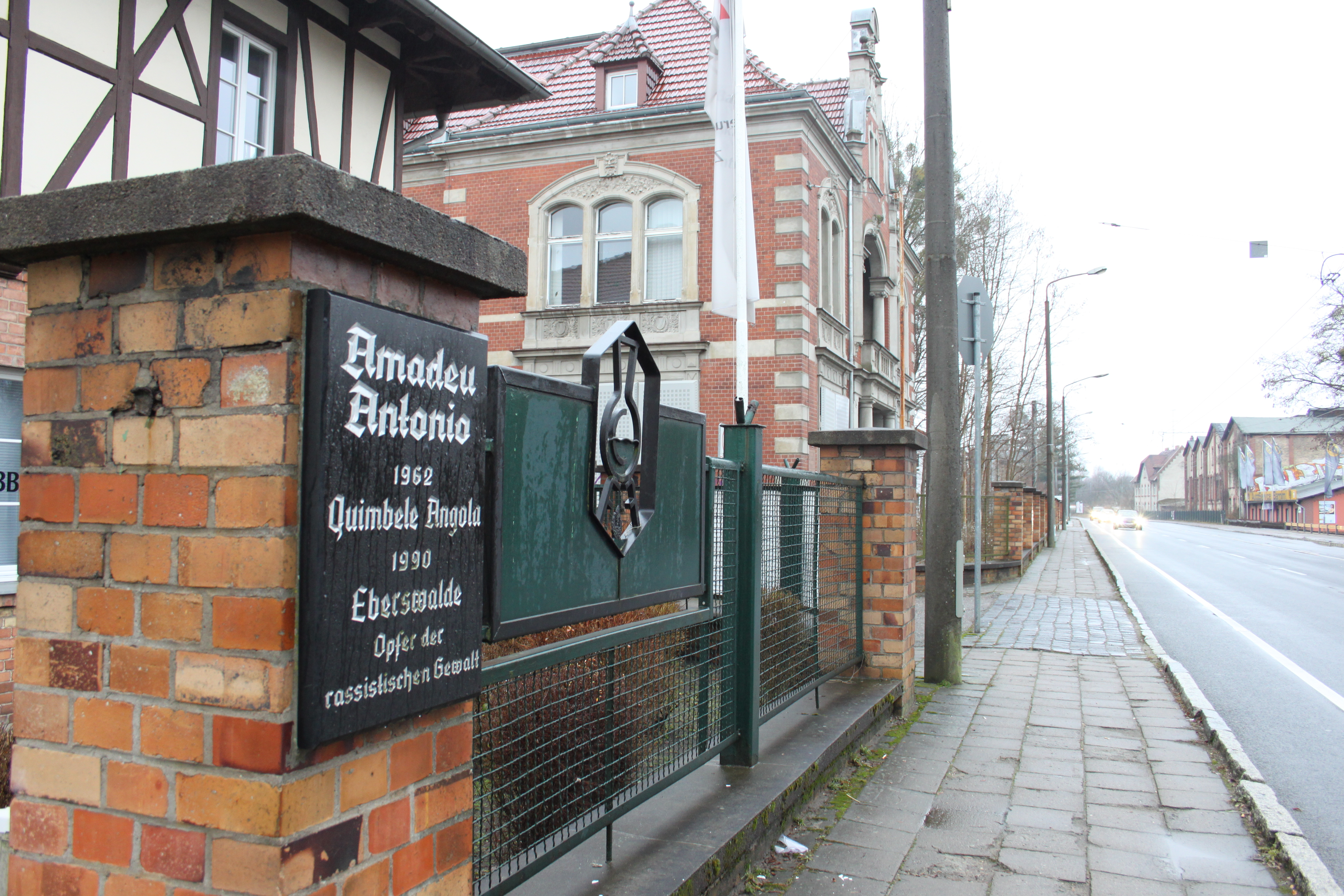
- Named after: Amadeu Antonio
- Formation: 1998
- Founder: Karl Konrad Graf von der Groeben
- Location: Germany
- Leader: Anetta Kahane
- Publication: Belltower.News
- Website: www.amadeu-antonio-stiftung.de

The Amadeu Antonio Foundation, established in 1998, is a German foundation engaging against far-right-wing parties, racism and antisemitism (including anti-Zionism). It was founded by Karl Konrad Graf von der Groeben, with author Anetta Kahane appointed as its chairwoman and Wolfgang Thierse, the former president of the Bundestag, named as its patron.

The Foundation is named after Amadeu Antonio, one of the first victims of far-right violence after the reunification of Germany in 1990.

== Work ==
The Foundation devises and executes a variety of projects campaigns, both online and offline, and collaborates with diverse institutions in the media, in civil society and at state level. Its work has included the following:

- Setting up an Internet platform, Mut gegen rechte Gewalt ("Courage against right-wing violence"), in partnership with Stern, a news magazine. This website provides information about trends in right-wing extremism, racism and anti-Semitism, as well as strategies to counteract them.
- Administering the Opferfonds Cura ("Victims' Fund Cura"), which provides direct support for victims of hate crime, raises awareness about the problems that they face, and holds information and consultation about the best methods of support
- Providing office resources for the website Netz gegen Nazis ("Net against Nazis", known as Belltower.News since 2017). In partnership with Die Zeit, the weekly newspaper, this website investigates and provides information about right-wing extremists, with a special focus on their online activities. In addition, the website and its staff provide consulting on how to handle right-wing extremists (for example, in the workplace) as well as a database with information about the right-wing extremist scene in Germany

Alongside this online provision, the Foundation carries out a significant amount of operating work. Through this, it considers possible strategies against right-wing extremism on the local level and researches the structure of the scene (for example, the examination of the role of women in the movement). One such project is "Kein Ort für Neonazis" (No Place for Neo-Nazis). Here the Foundation provides financial, administrative and expertise support for initiatives immediately prior to local, state or federal elections. Another project is "Region in Aktion" (region in action), which analyses how civil society can be supported in the wake of electoral victories by far-right parties in rural areas such as Mecklenburg-Vorpommern and Brandenburg. The Foundation also builds networks between initiatives at local level, promoting alternative youth cultures and communities to weaken the support for intolerance and racism. Within its financial support, the Foundation has so far supported more than 770 initiatives and projects which engage with racism, anti-Semitism, and right-wing extremism, and which advocate for a democratic culture and the rights of minorities.

== Strategic partners ==
The Foundation leverages its profile and resources to expand its role beyond Germany. Through developing strategic partnerships around Europe and in the United States, the Foundation hopes to meet challenges abroad with the same success and determination that it has at home. Its partners in Germany and abroad are as follows:

- Germany: Freudenberg Stiftung, Stern
- Europe: King Baudouin Foundation, European Foundation Center, WINGS, Network of European Foundations

== Funding ==
The Foundation is partially funded by the government of Germany through the initiative Demokratie Leben! The 2023 budget shows, on the revenue side, 2.5 million euros from donations and 6 million from public funds. Staff expenses were 6.3 million for 95 full time positions.
