= Richard Tüngel =

German newspaper editor

Richard Tüngel (1893 – 1970) was a German journalist and publisher, originally an architect and a longtime Director of Construction (Baudirektor) in Hamburg. He was a co-founder of Die Zeit.

== Life ==
Removed from this position by the Nazis in 1933, he went to Berlin, where he lived until 1945 as a translator and writer. For example, one still finds his name on current German-language editions of Igor Stravinsky's memoirs. Immediately after the war, he was one of the co-founders of Die Zeit, initially as fiction editor (Feuilletonchef) and a bit later as editor-in-chief.

After that it is remarkably difficult to find biographical information about him, not least because he had a rather inglorious departure from Die Zeit: He had to leave, after Marion Dönhoff had provoked a scandal by enforcing a decision concerning the political line of the paper. Tüngel, who was described by his successor as editor-in-chief as "...helpful and inconvenient. Brilliant and the embodiment of antagonism and artistic temperament," stood politically on the right and was steering Die Zeit into a current "farther right than the CDU" (the German Christian Democratic Union). In 1955, the "difficult, but at the same time respected and feared" man had to resign. The years-long arguments between Bucerius and the newspaper's co-founders, which had started as early as 1949, ended in 1956 because Tüngel was no longer a partner.

Tüngel's published Auf dem Bauche sollst du kriechen... Deutschland unter den Besatzungsmächten in 1958, co-written with journalist Hans Rudolf Berndorff and describing their experience of the immediate post-war years. The book is sometimes referred to as his "memoirs". The book was reissued by Matthes & Seitz Berlin Verlag.
