= Comprehensive Program for Socialist Economic Integration =

Economic program announced by COMECON in USSR

The Comprehensive Program for Socialist Economic Integration was set up in 1971, laying the guidelines for Comecon activity until 1990. The distinction between "market" relations and "planned" relations, made in the discussions within Comecon before the adoption of the 1971 Comprehensive Program, is still a useful approach to understanding Comecon activities. Comecon remained in fact a mixed system, combining elements of both plan and market economies. Although official rhetoric emphasized regional planning, it must be remembered that intra-Comecon relations continued to be conducted among national entities not governed by any supranational authority. They thus interacted on a decentralized basis according to terms negotiated in bilateral and multilateral agreements on trade and co-operation.

== Market relations and instruments ==
It is not surprising, given the size of the Soviet economy, that intra-Comecon trade was dominated by exchanges between the Soviet Union and the other members. Exchanges of Soviet fuels and raw materials for capital goods and manufactured items for consumer consumption had characterized trade, particularly among the original members. The liquidity shortage in the early 1980s forced the European Comecon countries to work to strengthen the importance of intraregional trade. In the early 1980s, intraregional trade rose to 60% of foreign trade of Comecon countries as a whole; for individual members it ranged from 45 to 50% in the case of Hungary, Romania, and the Soviet Union, to 83% for Cuba and 96% for Mongolia.

Trade among the members was negotiated on an annual basis and in considerable detail at the governmental level and was then followed up by interenterprise contracts. Early Comecon efforts to facilitate trade among members concentrated on development of uniform technical, legal, and statistical standards and on encouragement of long-term trade agreements. The 1971 Comprehensive Program sought to liberalize the system somewhat by recommending broad limits to "fixed-quota" trade among members (trade subject to quantitative or value targets set by bilateral trade agreements). Section VI, Paragraph 19 of the Comprehensive Program affirms that "mutual trade in commodities for which no quotas were established shall be carried on beginning in 1971 with a view to stimulating the development of trade turnover, through expansion of the range and assortment of traded commodities, and to making trade in these commodities more brisk." Later in the same paragraph the Comprehensive Program called on members to "seek opportunities to develop the export and import of quota-free commodities and to create conditions essential for trade in such commodities." There was no evidence, however, that this appeal has had significant effect or that quota-free trade has grown in importance under the program.

=== Prices ===
The 1971 Comprehensive Program also called for improvement in the Comecon system of foreign trade prices. Administratively set prices, such as those used in intra-Comecon trade, did not reflect costs or relative scarcities of inputs and outputs. For this reason, intra-comecon trade has been based on world market prices. By 1971 a price system governing exchanges among members had developed, under which prices agreed on through negotiation were fixed for five-year periods (corresponding to those of the synchronized, five-year plans of the members). These contract prices were based on adjusted world market prices averaged over the immediately preceding five years; that is, a world-price base was used as the starting point for negotiation. Under this system, therefore, intra-Comecon prices could and did depart substantially from relative prices on world markets.

Although the possibility of breaking this tenuous link with world prices and developing an indigenous system of prices for the Comecon market had been discussed in the 1960s, the evolution of Comecon prices after 1971 went in the opposite direction. Far from a technical or academic matter, the question of prices underlaid vital issues of the terms of, and hence gains from, intra-Comecon trade. In particular, relative to actual world prices, intra-Comecon prices in the early 1970s penalized raw materials exporters and benefited exporters of manufacturers. After the oil price explosion of 1973, Comecon foreign trade prices swung still further away from world prices to the disadvantage of Comecon suppliers of raw materials, in particular the Soviet Union. In view of the extraregional opportunities opened up by the expansion of east–west trade, this yawning gap between Comecon and world prices could no longer be ignored. Hence in 1975, at Soviet instigation, the system of intra-Comecon pricing was reformed.

The reform involved a substantial modification of existing procedures (known as the "Bucharest formula," from the location of the 9th Council Session in 1958 at which it was adopted), but not their abandonment. Under the modified Bucharest formula (which remained in effect in the late 1980s), prices were fixed every year and were based on a moving average of world prices for the preceding five years. The world-price base of the Bucharest formula was thus retained and still represented an average (although now moving) of adjusted world prices for the preceding five years. For 1975 alone, however, the average was for the preceding three years. Under these arrangements, intra-Comecon prices were more closely linked with world prices than before and throughout the remainder of the 1970s rose with world prices, although with a lag. Until the early 1980s, this new system benefited both the Soviet Union and the other Comecon countries since Soviet oil, priced with the lagged formula, was considerably cheaper than Organization of Petroleum Exporting Countries (OPEC) oil, the price of which increased drastically in the 1970s. By 1983-84 this system turned to the Soviet Union's advantage because world market oil prices began to fall, whereas the lagged Soviet oil prices continued to rise.

=== Exchange rates and currencies ===
Basic features of the state trading systems of the Comecon countries were multiple exchange rates and comprehensive exchange controls that severely restricted the convertibility of members' currencies.

These features were rooted in the planned character of the members' economies and their systems of administered prices. Currency inconvertibility in turn dictated bilateral balancing of accounts, which has been one of the basic objectives of intergovernmental trade agreements among members. An earlier system of bilateral clearing accounts was replaced on January 1, 1964, by accounts with the International Bank for Economic Cooperation, using the transferable rouble as the unit of account. Although the bank provided a centralized mechanism of trade accounting and swing credits to cover temporary imbalances, it could not establish a system of multilateral clearing because of the centrally planned nature of the members' economies and the inconvertibility of their currencies. In 1987, the transferable rouble remained an artificial currency functioning as an accounting unit and was not a common instrument for multilateral settlement. For this reason, this currency continued to be termed "transferable" and not "convertible."

The member countries recognized that the multiplicity and inconsistency of their administered exchange rates, the separation of their domestic prices from foreign prices, and the inconvertibility of their currencies were significant obstacles to multilateral trade and cooperation. As of early 1987, Comecon lacked not only a flexible means of payment but also a meaningful, standard unit of account. Both problems have vastly complicated the already complex multilateral projects and programs envisaged by the Comprehensive Program. The creation in 1971 of the International Investment Bank provided a mechanism for joint investment financing, but, like the International Bank for Economic Cooperation, this institution could not by itself resolve these fundamental monetary problems.

Recognizing that money and credit should play a more active role in the Comecon system, the Comprehensive Program established a timetable for the improvement of monetary relations. According to the timetable, measures would be taken "to strengthen and extend" the functions of the "collective currency" (the transferable rouble), and the conditions would be studied and prepared "to make the transferable rouble convertible into national currencies and to make national currencies mutually convertible." To this end, steps would be taken to introduce "economically well-founded and mutually coordinated" rates of exchange between members' currencies and "between 1976 and 1979" to prepare the groundwork for the introduction by 1980 of a "single rate of exchange for the national currency of every country." This timetable was not met. Only in Hungary were the conditions for convertibility gradually being introduced by reforms intended to link domestic prices more directly to world prices.

== Cooperation in planning ==
If countries are to gain from trade, that trade must be based on rational production structures reflecting resource scarcities. Since the early 1960s, official Comecon documents have stressed the need to promote among members' economies a more cost-effective pattern of specialization in production. This "international socialist division of labor" would, especially in the manufacturing sector, involve specialization within major branches of industry. In the absence of significant, decentralized allocation of resources within these economies, however, production specialization can be brought about only through the mechanism of the national plan and the investment decisions incorporated in it. In the absence at the regional level of supranational planning bodies, a rational pattern of production specialization among members' economies required coordination of national economic plans, a process that was not merely technical but also posed inescapable political problems.

The coordination of national five-year economic plans was the most traditional form of cooperation among the members in the area of planning. Although the process of consultation underlying plan coordination remained essentially bilateral, Comecon organs were indirectly involved. The standing commissions drew up proposals for consideration by competent, national planning bodies; the Secretariat assembled information on the results of bilateral consultations; and the Council Committee for Cooperation in Planning (created by Comecon in 1971 at the same session at which the Comprehensive Program was adopted) reviewed the progress of plan coordination by members.

In principle, plan coordination covered all economic sectors. Effective and comprehensive plan coordination has, however, been significantly impeded by the continued momentum of earlier parallel development strategies and the desire of members to minimize the risks of mutual dependence (especially given the uncertainties of supply that were characteristic of the members' economies). Plan coordination in practice, therefore, remained for the most part limited to mutual adjustment, through bilateral consultation, of the foreign trade sectors of national five-year plans. Under the Comprehensive Program, there were efforts to extend plan coordination beyond foreign trade to the spheres of production, investment, science, and technology.

=== Plan coordination ===
According to the 1971 Comprehensive Program, joint planning, multilateral or bilateral, was to be limited to "interested countries and was "not to interfere with the autonomy of internal planning." Participating countries would, moreover, retain national ownership of the productive capacities and resources jointly planned. But "joint plans worked out by the member countries would be taken into account by them when drafting their long-term or five-year plans."

The Comprehensive Program did not clearly assign responsibility for joint planning to any single agency. On the one hand, "coordination of work concerned with joint planning shall be carried out by the central planning bodies of Comecon member countries or their authorized representatives." On the other hand, "decisions on joint, multilateral planning of chosen branches and lines of production by interested countries shall be based on proposals by countries or Comecon agencies and shall be made by the Comecon Executive Committee, which also determines the Comecon agencies responsible for the organization of such work." Finally, mutual commitments resulting from joint planning and other aspects of cooperation were to be incorporated in agreements signed by the interested parties.

It was extremely difficult to gauge the implementation of plan coordination or joint planning under the Comprehensive Program or to assess the activities of the diverse international economic organizations. There was no single, adequate measure of such cooperation. The only data on activities among the Comecon countries published by the annual Comecon yearbooks referred to merchandise trade, and these trade figures could not be readily associated with cooperative measures taken under the Comprehensive Program. Occasional official figures were published, however, on the aggregate number of industrial specialization and co-production agreements signed by members.

=== Joint projects ===
The clearest area of achievement under the Comprehensive Program has been the joint exploitation and development of natural resources for the economies of the member countries. Joint projects eased the investment burden on a single country when expansion of its production capacity was required to satisfy the needs of other members. Particular attention has been given to energy and fuels, forest industries, iron and steel, and various other metals and minerals. Most of this activity was carried out in the former Soviet Union, the great storehouse of natural resources within Comecon.

Joint development projects were usually organized on a "compensation" basis, a form of investment "in kind." Participating members advance materials, equipment and, more recently, manpower and were repaid through scheduled deliveries of the output resulting from, or distributed through, the new facility. Repayment included a modest "fraternal" rate of interest, but the real financial return to the participating countries depended on the value of the output at the time of delivery. Deliveries at contract prices below world prices would provide an important extra return. No doubt the most important advantage from participation in joint projects, however, was the guarantee of long-term access to basic fuels and raw materials in a world of increasing uncertainty of supply of such products.

=== Concerted Plan ===
The multilateral development projects concluded under the Comprehensive Program formed the backbone of Comecon's Concerted Plan for the 1976-80 period. The program allotted 9 billion roubles (nearly US$12 billion at the official 1975 exchange rate of US$1.30 per rouble) for joint investments. The Orenburg project was the largest project under the Comprehensive Program. It was undertaken by all East European Comecon countries and the Soviet Union at an estimated cost ranging from the equivalent of US$5 billion to US$6 billion, or about half of the cost of all Comecon projects under the Concerted Plan. It consisted of a natural gas complex at Orenburg in western Siberia and the 2,677-kilometer Union (Soiuz) natural-gas pipeline, completed in 1978, which links the complex to the western border of the Soviet Union. Construction of a pulp mill in Ust' Ilim (in central Siberia) was the other major project under this program.

These two projects differed from other joint Comecon investments projects in that they were jointly planned and jointly built in the host country (the Soviet Union in both cases). Although the other projects were jointly planned, each country was responsible only for construction within its own borders. Western technology, equipment, and financing played a considerable role. The Soviet Union owned the Orenburg complex and the Ust' Ilim installation and was repaying its East European co-investors at a 2% interest rate with an agreed-upon amount of natural gas and wood pulp.

The early 1980s were characterized by more bilateral investment specialization but on a much smaller scale than required for the Orenburg and Ust' Ilim projects. In these latter projects, Eastern Europe provided machinery and equipment for Soviet multilateral resource development. Work also progressed on the previously mentioned Long-Term Target Programs for Cooperation.

=== Cooperation in science and technology ===
To supplement national efforts to upgrade indigenous technology, the 1971 Comprehensive Program emphasized cooperation in science and technology. The development of new technology was envisaged as a major object of cooperation; collaboration in resource development and specialization in production were to be facilitated by transfers of technology between members. The 1971 Comecon session, which adopted the Comprehensive Program, decided to establish the Special Council Committee for Scientific and Technical Cooperation to ensure the organization and fulfillment of the provisions of the program in this area. Jointly planned and coordinated research programs have extended to the creation of joint research institutes and centers. In terms of number of patents, documents, and other scientific and technical information exchanges, the available data indicate that the Soviet Union has been the dominant source of technology within Comecon. It has, on the whole, provided more technology to its East European partners than it has received from them, although the balance varies considerably from country to country depending upon relative levels of industrial development. Soviet science also formed the base for several high-technology programs for regional specialization and cooperation, such as nuclear power and computers (see ES EVM).

The Comprehensive Program for Scientific and Technical Progress up to the Year 2000, adopted in December 1985, has boosted cooperation in science and technology in the late 1980s. The program set forth 93 projects and 800 subprojects within 5 broad areas of development. A Soviet ministry supervised each of the areas and was responsible for the technical level and quality of output, compliance with research and production schedules, costs, and sales. Each project was headed by a Soviet organization, which awarded contracts to other Comecon-member organizations. The Soviet project heads, who were not responsible to domestic planners, had extensive executive powers of their own and will closely supervise all activities. The program represented a fundamentally new approach to multilateral collaboration and a first step toward investing Comecon with some supranational authority.

=== Labor resources ===
Just as the 1971 Comprehensive Program stimulated investment flows and technology transfers among members, it also increased intra-Comecon flows of another important factor of production: labor. Most of the transfers occurred in connection with joint resource development projects, e.g., Bulgarian workers aiding in the exploitation of Siberian forest resources, Polish workers assisting in the construction of the Union pipeline, or Vietnamese workers helping on the Friendship pipeline in the Soviet Union. Labor was also transferred in response to labor imbalances in member countries. Hungarian workers, for example, were sent to work in East Germany under a bilateral agreement between the two countries. Such transfers, however, are restricted by the universal scarcity of labor that has emerged with the industrialization of the less developed Comecon countries. Moreover, the presence of foreign workers has raised practical and ideological issues in socialist planned economies. Cooperation in the area of labor has been by no means limited to planned exchanges of manpower. Comecon countries have exchanged information on experience in manpower planning and employment and wage policies through Comecon organs and activities.

== Changes in the mid-1980s ==
By 1987, Comecon's Comprehensive Program, adopted in 1971, had undergone considerable change. Multilateral planning faded into traditional bilateral cooperation, and the Bucharest formula for prices assumed a revised form. The 1985 Comprehensive Program for the Development of Science and Technology or, as some Western analysts call it, the "Gorbachev Charter," was Comecon's new blueprint for taking a firm grip on its future. Experience in the early 1980s showed that turning to the West and Japan for technological advancement put Comecon in a very dangerous position because it pulled the East European members further away from the Soviet Union and threatened to leave the entire organization at the mercy of the West. The purpose of the 1985 program was to offset centrifugal forces and reduce Comecon's vulnerability to "technological blackmail" through broadened mutual cooperation, increased efficiency of cooperation, and improved quality of output.

The success of the 1985 program would be closely tied to the success of Gorbachev's changes in the Soviet economy. Major projects for the 1986-90 period included a 5,600 km natural-gas pipeline from the Yamburg Peninsula (in northern Siberia) to Eastern Europe; the Krivoy Rog (in the Ukraine), a mining and enrichment combine that would produce 13 million tons of iron ore annually; the production and exchange of 500 million roubles' worth (approximately US$650 million) of equipment for nuclear power plants; and joint projects for extracting coal in Poland, magnesite in Czechoslovakia, nickel in Cuba, and nonferrous metals in Mongolia.
