= Anetta Kahane =

German journalist and activist (born 1954)

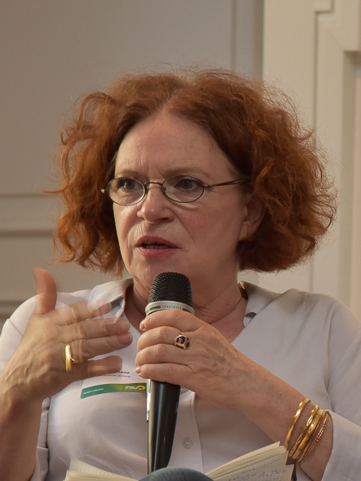
- Kahane in 2016
- Born: 1954 (age 71–72); East Berlin, East Germany
- Occupations: Journalist; author; activist
- Parents: Max Kahane (father); Doris Kahane (mother)

Anetta Kahane (born 1954 in East Berlin) is a German left-wing journalist, author and activist against antisemitism, racism and right-wing extremism. From 1974 to 1982 she was an unofficial collaborator for the East German Stasi secret police. In 1998 she founded the Amadeu Antonio Foundation, which she has led since 2003. She has been a target of right wing hate campaigns since 2002 and of possible terror plans since 2015, which are investigated by the German General prosecutor.

== Family background and youth ==
Kahane's parents Max Kahane and Doris Kahane (born Machol) were secular Jews who fled from Nazi Germany in 1933. Max Kahane fought in the Spanish Civil War against General Francisco Franco and later in the French Resistance against the Nazis. In a prison camp of the Vichy Regime he met Doris Machol, who was also active in the Resistance. They married in 1945, moved to East Berlin, and became loyal citizens of the German Democratic Republic and members of the Socialist Unity Party of Germany.

Kahane is the youngest of three children. Following Max Kahane's jobs as a journalist for the East German news agency and state media, the family lived in New Delhi (India) from 1957 to 1960, in Rio de Janeiro in 1963. Like other Holocaust survivors her parents did not speak about their experience of persecution, but their psychological traumas influenced Kahane. In school Kahane was open about her Judaism, against her parents' will.

== Student and Stasi informer ==
Beginning in 1974 Kahane studied Latin American studies in Rostock. That year the Stasi questioned her about the defection of her best friend. She agreed to work for the Stasi as an unofficial collaborator. She met a Stasi officer six times a year on average, and reported her observations about West German tourists and other foreigners. At first the Stasi noted that she incriminated friends and fellow students, but soon they noted her to be unreliable and hard to manage. She once reported on the artists Thomas Brasch and Klaus Brasch, whom the Stasi had categorized as "enemies of the GDR", and confirmed that judgement without specifics.

From 1979 she continued her studies at Humboldt University of Berlin and taught the Portuguese language. In 1979 and 1981 she worked as a translator for GDR engineering projects in São Tomé and Príncipe and Mozambique, where she observed East German officials behaving in a racist and condescending manner towards black Africans. In 1982 she refused to continue as a Stasi informant, and as a result she lost the freedom to travel outside the GDR, her position at the university, and most of her translation work.

From 1983 to at least 1988 the Stasi had her under surveillance. In 1986 she applied to leave the GDR. In 1990, when the GDR had dissolved, she admitted to her friends that she had been a Stasi informant, but decided not to publicize it.

In 2002, Kahane's past as a former Stasi informant became known. In 2004, in her autobiography, she wrote in detail about this part of her past and admitted to being very ashamed of it. In 2012 the political scientist Helmut Müller-Enbergs examined the Stasi documents about her case on her behalf. He found no indications that her reports caused any damage to observed persons, but he did not exclude disadvantages her reports might have caused in general. He also found that she received no awards or other advantages. This conclusion has faced criticism, however, as it leaves out her incrimination of dozens of people from her immediate environment, most notably that of Klaus Brasch and Thomas Brasch.

== Activism ==
From 1988, Kahane was active in the civil rights movement of the GDR opposition, and supported foreigners and minorities. She participated in the East German Round Table. In 1990 she was appointed to be the first and last official for foreigners of the East Berlin Senate. After witnessing street violence and attacks on Sinti, Romani people, Africans and Vietnamese, she engaged constantly against daily racism. She pressured the city leadership to transform former military barracks into housing for eastern European migrants and refugees.

Since 1989, Kahane has initiated many associations for issues of foreigners, and became a respected expert on this topic. Responding to increased racist violence in the former East Germany, in 1998, Kahane initiated the Amadeu Antonio Foundation as an organised effort to combat xenophobia, antisemitism and right-wing extremism. In 2012 she was awarded the Moses Mendelssohn prize for her work, donated by the Senate of Berlin. In July 2015, she supported the suggestion of the Minister-President of Baden-Württemberg Winfried Kretschmann to send more refugees to the New states of Germany because, according to her, the number of people of color is too low there. In December 2015, she followed an invitation of the German Federal Ministry of Justice and Consumer Protection to take part in a task force against hate speech on social media.

Kahane is a regular columnist for Berliner Zeitung and Frankfurter Rundschau.

In 2015, there was controversy after she stated in an interview with Der Tagesspiegel that the fact that "one-third of Germany's territory has remained predominantly white" is "the biggest declaration of bankruptcy" of German politics since Germany's reunification.

Kahane was a potential target of the suspected right-wing terrorist and Bundeswehr soldier Franco Albrecht, who had planned to kill her with a shotgun in Berlin.

Kahane is a critic of "hostility toward Israel" within German society, which she considers rooted in antisemitism.

== Publications ==
- Ich durfte, die anderen mussten. In: Vincent von Wroblewsky (ed): Zwischen Thora und Trabant: Juden in der DDR. Aufbau-Verlag, Berlin 1993, ISBN 978-3-7466-7011-9, p. 124–144 (German)
- Ich sehe was, was du nicht siehst: meine deutschen Geschichten. Rowohlt, Berlin 2004, ISBN 978-3-87134-470-1 (German)

== Awards ==
- 1991: Theodor-Heuss-Medallie
- 2002: Moses-Mendelssohn-Preis of Berlin
