= Die Achse des Guten =

German political blog

Logo since 2016

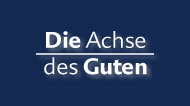
Former logo

Die Achse des Guten (German for The Axis of the Good) is a political right blog run by the publicists Henryk M. Broder and Dirk Maxeiner that identifies itself as a "publicist network".

According to its own data, the blog had over 670,000 visitors in January 2010, according to a report of die tageszeitung, the blog had 50,000 visitors a month in 2005. The blog self-identifies as "liberal and pro-West", among its topics are Islam, the spread of Islam, climate change denial and political correctness.
