= Die Zeit =

German national weekly newspaper

- 7 October 2006 front page
- Type: Weekly newspaper
- Format: Broadsheet
- Owner(s): Zeitverlag Gerd Bucerius GmbH & Co. KG (Holtzbrinck family through DvH Medien GmbH 50%, Holtzbrinck Publishing Group 50%)
- Editor: Giovanni di Lorenzo
- Founded: 21 February 1946; 80 years ago
- Political alignment: Centre-left; Liberal
- Headquarters: Hamburg
- Circulation: 574,492 (Print, 2020); 186,062 (Digital, 2020)
- ISSN: 0044-2070
- Website: zeit.de

Die Zeit (German pronunciation: [diː ˈtsaɪt], lit. 'The Time') is a German national weekly newspaper published in Hamburg in Germany. The newspaper is generally considered to be among the German newspapers of record and is known for its long and extensive articles.

== History ==
The first edition of Die Zeit was first published in Hamburg on 21 February 1946. The founding publishers were Gerd Bucerius, Lovis H. Lorenz, Richard Tüngel and Ewald Schmidt di Simoni. Marion Gräfin Dönhoff joined as an editor in March 1946. She became publisher of Die Zeit from 1972 until her death in 2002. In 1983 she was joined by former German chancellor Helmut Schmidt. Later Josef Joffe and former German federal secretary of culture Michael Naumann joined them as well.

The paper's publishing house, Zeitverlag Gerd Bucerius in Hamburg, is owned by the Georg von Holtzbrinck Publishing Group and Dieter von Holtzbrinck Media. The paper is published weekly on Thursdays.

As of 2018, Die Zeit has additional offices in Brussels, Dresden, Frankfurt, Moscow, New York City, Paris, Istanbul, Washington, D.C., and Vienna. In 2018, it re-opened an office in Beijing.

=== Editors-in-chief ===
- 1946: Ernst Samhaber
- 1946–1955: Richard Tüngel
- 1957–1968: Josef Müller-Marein
- 1968–1972: Marion Gräfin Dönhoff
- 1973–1992: Theo Sommer
- 1992–1997: Robert Leicht
- 1997–2001: Roger de Weck
- 2001–2004: Josef Joffe and Michael Naumann
- 2004–present: Giovanni di Lorenzo

== Orientation ==
The paper is considered to be highbrow. Its political direction is centrist and liberal or left-liberal.

Die Zeit often publishes dossiers, essays, third-party articles and excerpts of lectures of different authors emphasising their points of view on a single aspect or topic in one or in consecutive issues. It is known for its very large physical paper format (Nordisch) and its long and detailed articles.

== Print edition ==
=== Sections and supplements ===
Die Zeit is divided into different sections, some of which are:

- Politik (politics)
- Streit (dispute)
- Dossier (dossier)
- Geschichte (history)
- Wirtschaft (economy)
- Wissen (science)
- Feuilleton (features)
- Zeitmagazin

=== Appearance and printing ===
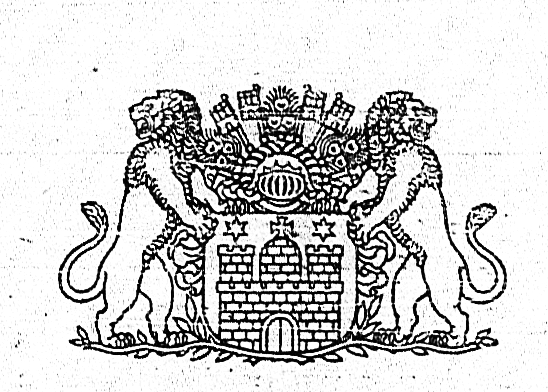
Hamburg crest used in edition 1 to 12 (1946) by C.O. Czeschka; closed gate

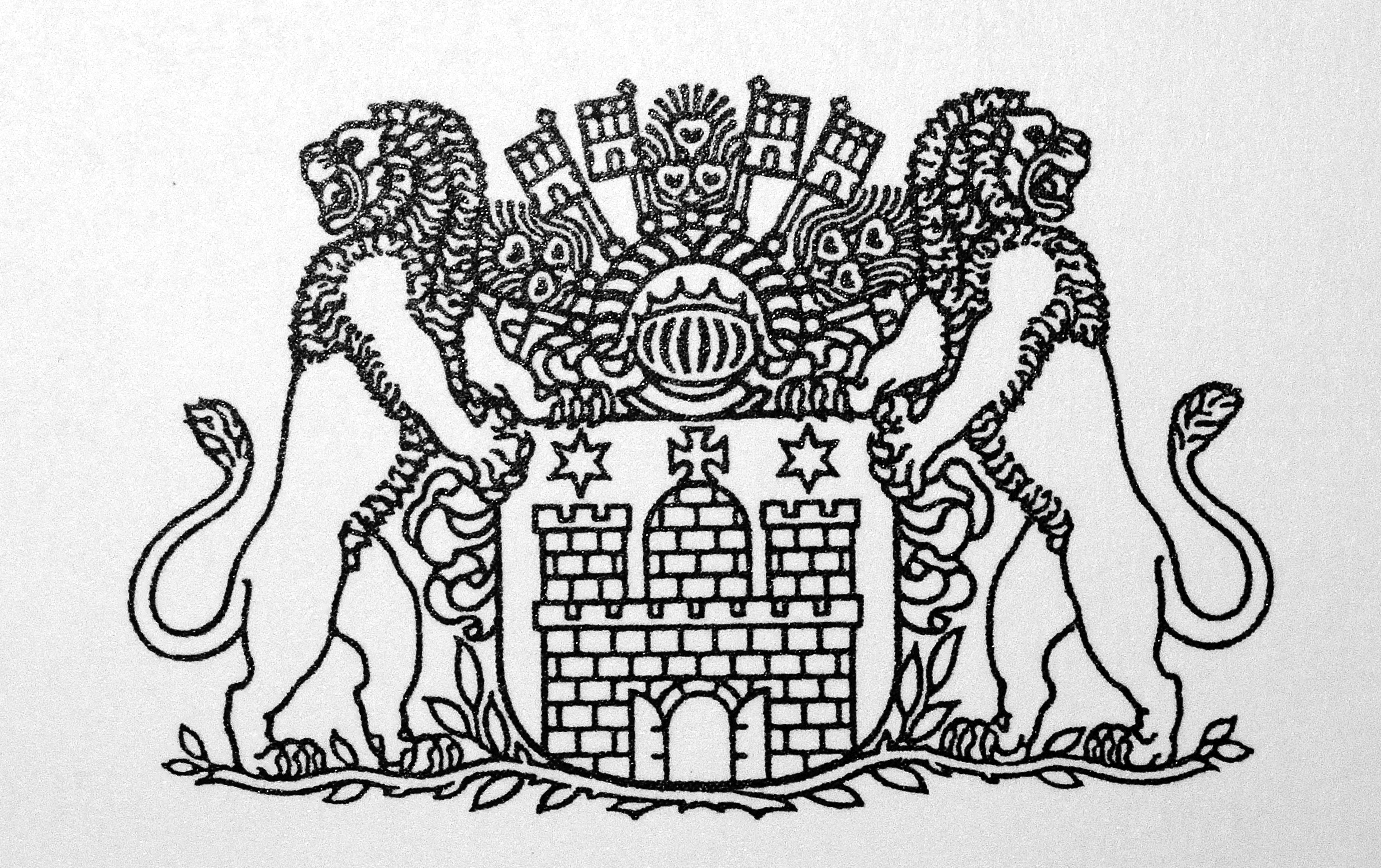
Hamburg crest used in edition 13 to 18 (1946) by C.O. Czeschka; open gate

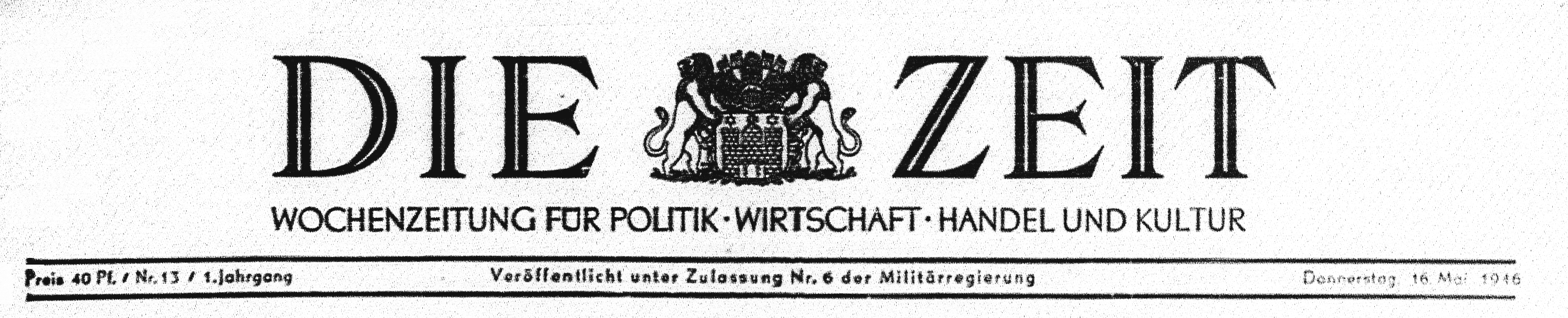
Zeit masthead edition 13 to 18 (1946)

Zeit masthead since edition 19 (1946)

The masthead lettering in the weekly Die Zeit with its elegant font was designed by Carl Otto Czeschka in 1946. Czeschka was inspired by the British daily newspaper The Times which shows the British national coat of arms in between The and Times. This was not only for graphic reasons, it also represented the founder's self-conception which he published in an editorial called "Unsere Aufgabe" ("Our Mission") on 21 February 1946.

The very first version of Czeschka's design, which included the Hamburg crest, was used from the first edition (published on 21 February 1946) to the 12th edition (published on 9 May 1946). Other than the official coat of arms this crest featured peacock's feathers with little hearts on them. Additionally, the position of the lions' legs first resembled those of the old great coat of arms. The positions were changed in 1952. Regardless of this tiny difference, the crest was viewed as the great Hamburg coat of arms by the Hamburg Senate and was therefore considered a national emblem. Upon this, the crest was revised: An open gate was supposed to be incorporated to represent the cosmopolitanism of the hanseatic city. However, the Senate also declined this version that was printed in editions 13 to 18, as it was viewed a misuse of a national emblem for commercial purposes, which is still prohibited to this day. To avoid another prohibition, Zeit Magazin changed its masthead on 27 June 1946, into the Coat of arms of Bremen: The key and the golden crown of the city coat of arms, which was approved by Wilhelm Kaisen, the mayor of Bremen. This happened as a result of the mediation from Josef Müller-Marein who later became the editorial director of Die Zeit. The design with the Bremer Schlüssel in its masthead was also designed by Carl Otto Czeschka and is used as the logo of the whole publishing group today. With the demand from Ernst Samhaber, the Hamburg artist Alfred Mahlau had created the whole first edition which had a five-column break. The edition was printed in the printing house Broscheck in Hamburg. At the same time, Czeschka had also drawn the headlines of the first edition for the different sections of the newspaper. The articles of Die Zeit and, especially the leading articles on the first page, are traditionally longer and more detailed than the ones of a daily newspaper. However, in the past few years many articles have been noticeably shorter and include more pictures. Since the redesign by Mario Garcia in January 1998, the headlines have been printed in Tiemann-Antiqua. The running texts are printed in Garamond, a font that is very frequently used in books.

Die Zeit did not join the discussion about the return of the traditional German orthography, which was led by Der Spiegel, Süddeutsche Zeitung and Bild. Starting in 1999, the newspaper used its in-house orthography which derived from the traditional orthography as well as from the different versions of the reformed orthography, which were edited by Dieter E. Zimmer. Since 2007, Die Zeit refrained from using the in-house orthography and started following the recommendations of the Duden. The nordisch format, a trademark of the newspaper, has always been addressed in literature and cabaret—mostly in satirical form. According to Hanns Dieter Hüsche Die Zeit is "so groß, wenn man die aufschlägt, muss der Nachbar gleich zum Zahnarzt" (lit. 'so big, if you open it, the neighbour must go to the dentist immediately'). In reality however, the format is not bigger than that of a dozen other German newspapers. Die Zeit is printed by the Frankfurter Societäts-Druckerei GmbH in Mörfelden-Walldorf. The Deutscher Pressevertrieb, based in Hamburg, is in charge of the distribution of the newspapers.

=== Zeitmagazin ===
The Zeitmagazin was first published as a supplement in 1970 and later discontinued in 1999. Die Zeit then introduced the section Leben (English: Lifestyle). Since 24 May 2007, Die Zeit reintroduced the Zeitmagazin. For the supplement's 40th birthday, Die Zeit published a 100-page anniversary issue, including 40 different covers – one for each year.

=== Circulation ===
The 1993 circulation of Die Zeit was 500,000 copies. With a circulation of 504,072 for the second half of 2012 and an estimated readership of slightly above 2 million, it is the most widely read German weekly newspaper. It reached 520,000 copies in the first quarter of 2013.

== Zeit Online ==
2017 logo

Zeit Online is run by Zeit Online GmbH, a fully owned subsidiary of the publishing company Zeitverlag. The independent editorial office consists of around 70 editors, graphic designers and technicians.

On 1 February 2009, Zeit Online, Tagesspiegel Online and zoomer.de were merged into Zeit Digital with one joint editorial office in Berlin. Zoomer.de was discontinued in February 2009, and the editorial office of Tagesspiegel Online was handed back to Tagesspiegel in September 2009. In 2017, Die Zeit was among the most quoted sources in German Wikipedia.

At present, it is one of the 100 most visited websites in Germany. A selection of stories are published in English.

=== Sections ===
The content is categorized into four section groups that each consist of one or more sections, as follows:

- Politics, Economy and Society
- Culture and Discovery
- Knowledge & Digital
- Sports

Since April 2014, Zeit Online has also been publishing a local section for Hamburg.

In a survey of German literature blogs, the literature section of Zeit Online was rated as the best portal, better than the literature section of Der Spiegel, Süddeutsche Zeitung and Frankfurter Allgemeine Zeitung, amongst others.

On 2 November 2012, Zeit Online launched a Content API which is available for software developers.

=== Website traffic ===
Prior to 2017, Die Zeit experienced a significant increase in clicks on their website. In March 2017, Z+ was launched and so was a payment model for the new product. Since then, some of the content has only been available after payment.

In January 2019, the website was visited 75.1 million times. On average, 2.34 pages were opened per visit.

=== Recent history ===
Gero von Randow, a former Die Zeit editor, was the editor-in-chief until February 2008. The journalist Wolfgang Blau took over his position in March of that year. When Blau joined The Guardian in April 2013, Jochen Wegner subsequently took over, and has been in charge since 15 March 2013. Before that, he had been the editor-in-chief at Focus Online from 2006 to 2010.

Being part of the same publishing group, Die Zeit and Berliner Tagesspiegel decided to cooperate in September 2006. Since then, they have been exchanging and sharing some of their online content. Zeit has similar relationships with other German online news portals such as Handelsblatt and Golem.de.

=== Cooperations ===
In June 2008, Zeit Online started a cooperation with ZDF and broadcast their news in a display format called 100 Sekunden (English: 100 seconds). Starting in 2018, the online presence of brand eins and Zeit Online were merged and are now marketed together.

==== Zünder ====
Between 2005 and 2009, Zeit Online introduced Zünder (igniter) which was an online platform for young adults in Germany between the ages of 16 and 25.

==== Zeit Campus Online ====
Zeit Campus Online started in 2006 as an online version of the printed magazine Zeit Campus.

==== Störungsmelder ====
In 2007, Zeit Online started a cooperation with the music magazine Intro, the union Gesicht Zeigen! (show your face!), and the agency WE DO as well as the moderators Markus Kavka, Ole Tillmann and Klaas Heufer-Umlauf. The project is called Störungsmelder (trouble reporting) and is directed against right-wing extremism.

==== Netz gegen Nazis ====
On 5 May 2008, Zeit Online started a project in cooperation with partners such as the German Football Association, the German Fire Department Association, the VZ-networks, the ZDF and the German Olympic Sports Confederation to start the online platform Netz gegen Nazis (English: Web against Nazis). The web portal was subject to criticism from the journalists. This was based on the platform not providing new information and only arguing superficially. On 1 January 2009, Die Zeit withdrew their contribution to the project and handed over administration to the Amadeu Antonio Foundation. The project has since been renamed to Belltower.News.

==== ze.tt ====
On 27 July 2015, the publishing house started a new online format called ze.tt, aimed at young readers who spend a large amount of time on social-media.

==== Search tool ====
In 2026, Die Zeit released a search tool, in cooperation with archives in Germany and in the United States, that allows people to search through several million Nazi Party membership cards, the "NSDAP-Mitgliederkartei", to see whether their ancestors were members of the Nazi Party.

== Controversy ==
=== Big Brother Award ===
In June 2019, Zeit Online was awarded with the Big Brother Award in the category consumer protection. The newspaper disputed the reasoning and methodology used to decide the negative award. Jochen Wegner, editor-in-chief, noted the flawed justification when accepting the award in Bielefeld.

== See also ==
- ZEIT-Stiftung
