= Vertragsarbeiter =

Foreign workers and trainees who worked in East Germany

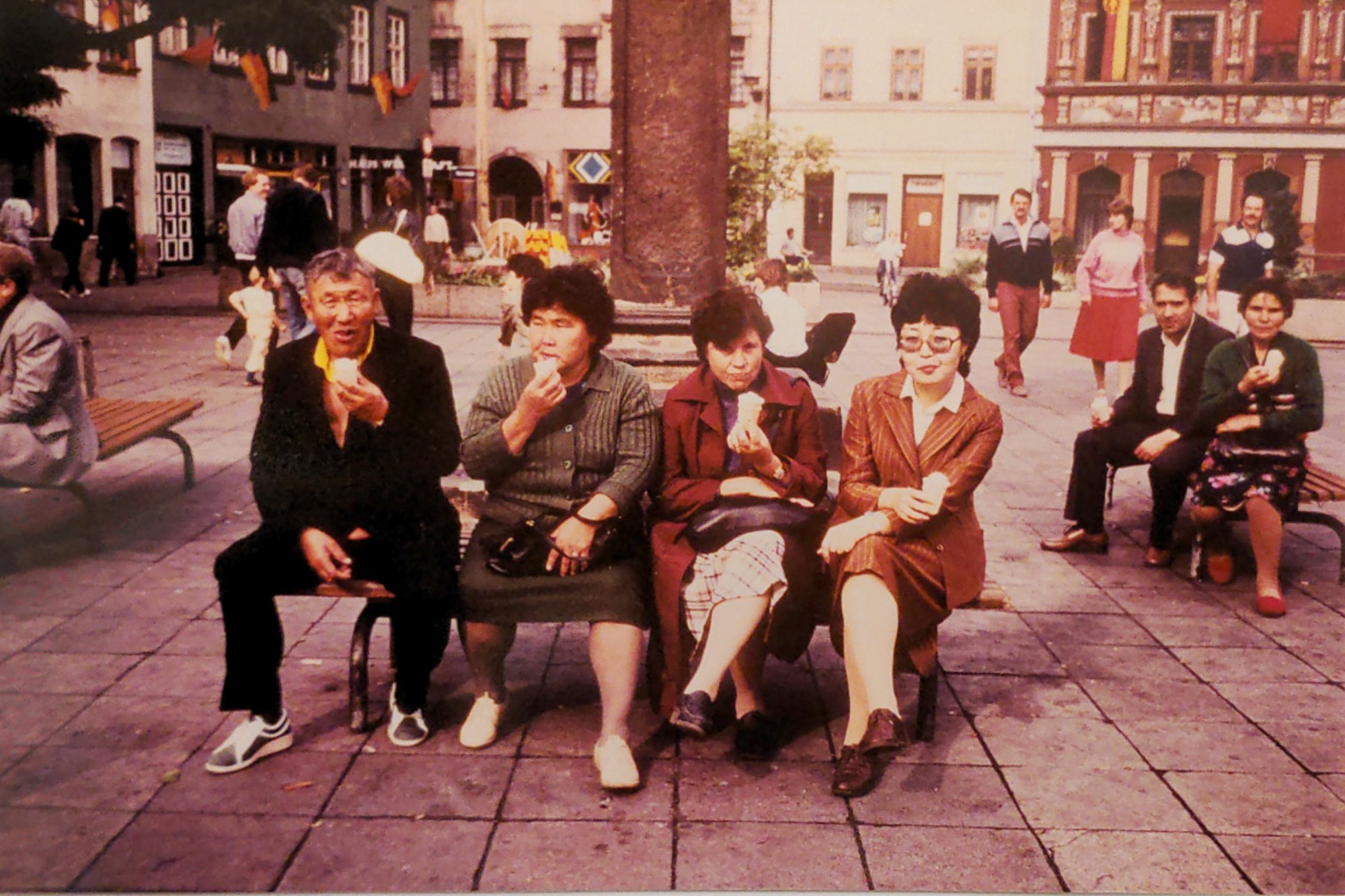
Vertragsarbeiter in Erfurt, 1985

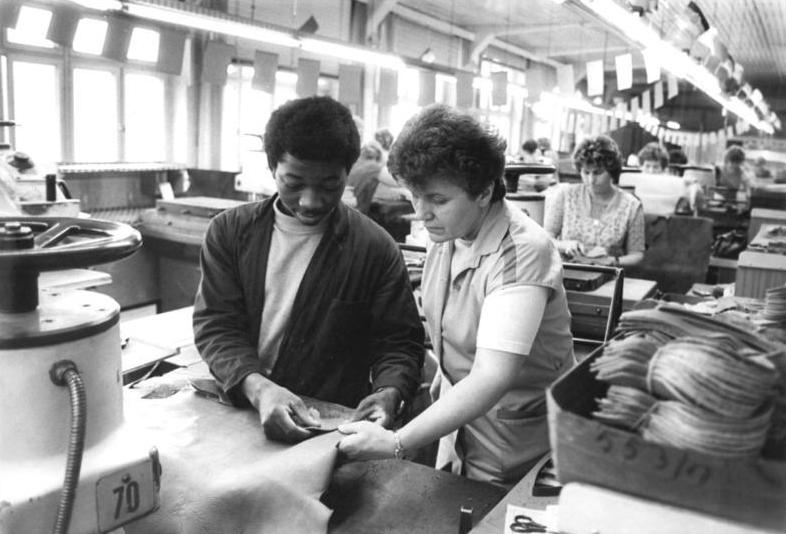
Cordwainer trainee from Namibia at a clothing factory, 1985

Vertragsarbeiter (Contract workers) were foreign workers and trainees who worked in East Germany. They were living in the country long-term, without the intention of being integrated as guest workers. However, this did not include employees of foreign companies, foreign students, members of the Soviet armed forces and their families, refugees or foreign trainees. Most of the workers were from Mozambique and Vietnam. Contract workers also worked in economically more advanced Comecon countries such as Czechoslovakia and the People's Republic of Hungary.

Contract workers were brought in to reinforce understaffed areas of work, such as light industry or the consumer goods industry. The respective conditions, length of stay, rights and number of contract workers were negotiated individually with the respective government (by a so-called state contract). The duration of the residence permit varied between two and six years depending on the origin. A permanent stay, however, was not provided for by contract or by law.

The moving of family members was excluded. At the end of the contractual period, contract workers usually had to leave and return to their home country. In East Germany, contract workers lived in separate dormitories during their stay, mostly set up by East German businesses and clearly separated from the local population.

In addition, contact between guest workers and East German citizens was extremely limited; Gastarbeiter were usually restricted to their dormitory or an area of the city which Germans were not allowed to enter — furthermore sexual relations with a German led to deportation. Female Vertragsarbeiter were not allowed to become pregnant during their stay. If they did, they were forced to have an abortion or faced deportation.

== See also ==
- West German Gastarbeiter
