= Christian Friedrich Erndel =

- Born: 1683; Dresden
- Died: 23 January 1767 (aged 83–84); Dresden-Neustadt
- Burial place: Alter Annenfriedhof
- Other names: Christian Friedrich Erndl; Christian Friedrich Erndtel
- Relatives: Christian Heinrich Erndel (brother)
- Military career
- Allegiance: Electorate of Saxony
- Rank: Major General
- Conflicts: War of the Polish Succession

Christian Friedrich Erndel (born 1683 in Dresden; died 23 January 1767 in Dresden-Neustadt) was a Royal Polish and Electoral Saxon Major-General of the Artillery Corps.

== Life ==
=== Family ===
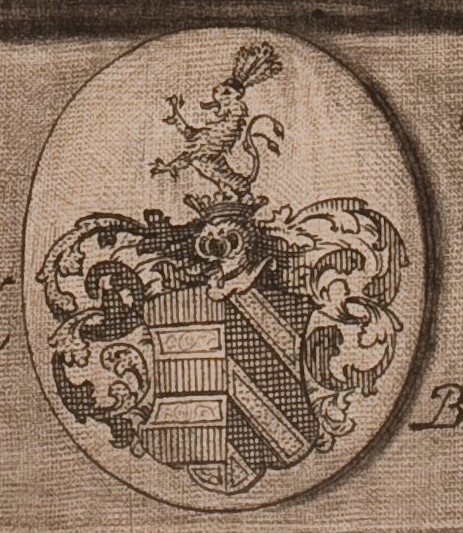
Erndel Coat of Arms

Christian Friedrich Erndel (also Erndl, Erndtel) was the last to be born of his parents' twelve children, born in Dresden in 1683. His parents were Dr. Heinrich III. Erndel (born 17 June 1638 in Dresden, died 13 September 1693 in Dresden, buried in the Kirche zu unser lieben Frauen there), lord of the manors of Berreuth near Dippoldiswalde and Mulda near Freiberg, Royal Polish and Electoral Saxon Personal Physician, married since 4 September 1665 in Dresden to Sophia Elisabeth Erndel née Ratke (born 8 July 1642 in Dresden; died 10 June 1685 at Berreuth), a daughter of Martin Ratke, Privy Chamberlain of Johann Georg I, Elector of Saxony and Johann Georg II, Elector of Saxony. Having lost both his parents at a young age, his legal guardian was Johannes Seebisch (born 12 December 1634 at Zwickau; died 1700 at Dresden), who, in 1670, was the archdeacon of the Kreuzkirche and in 1697 the City Minister (Stadtprediger) in Dresden. Erndel‘s paternal grandfather, Dr. Heinrich II. Erndel (born 7 April 1595 at Regensburg; died 25 July 1646 in Oschersleben, interred in the church there) was the Personal Physician to Johann Georg I, Elector of Saxony. Great-grandfather Heinrich I. Erndel (baptised on 15 July 1569 in Regensburg; interred on 15 July 1623 in the church in Wolfenbüttel), was the Personal and Court Apothecary in Prague to Rudolf II, Holy Roman Emperor (died 1612) and Matthias, Holy Roman Emperor (died 1619) who awarded him a Nobility Diploma in 1617. His sister Maria Erndl was the wife of Andreas Raselius Ambergensis and their father was Matthis 'Mattäus' Erndl, the Apothecary at the Kohlenmarkt - later known as the Mohrenapotheke in Regensburg.

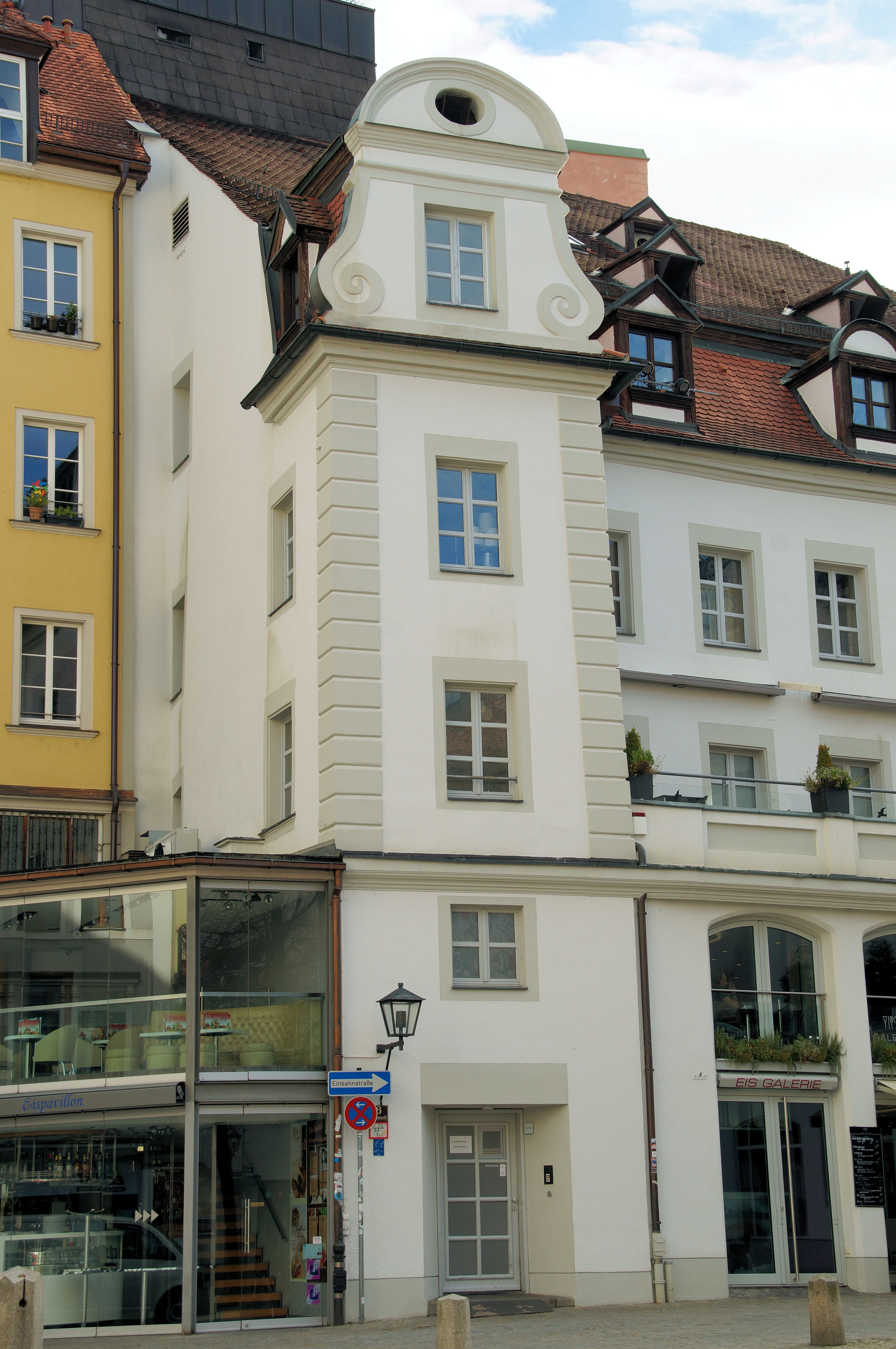
Kohlenmarkt 6 in Regensburg, until 1860 housed the Mohrenapotheke

Erndel's older brother was Christian Heinrich Erndel (born 1676 at Dresden; died 17 March 1734 at Dresden, interred in the Fischer family's vault at the Alter Annenfriedhof), Personal Physician to August the Strong, also a botanist and meteorologist in Dresden and Warsaw, the author of many publications on the subject and on his travels with his employer.

Erndel’s brothers-in-law were:

1. Johann George Seidel (born 18 February 1658 at Zschopau; died 13 April 1739 at Meißen, interred in the St. Afra Church in Meißen, where he had been a Deacon for many years), husband of Maria Sophia née Erndel;
2. the advocate Dr. jur. Caspar Christian Kober (born 9 July 1663 at Naumburg; died 11 September 1738 at Dresden), interred in the Church at Kötzschenbroda, where he owned a vineyard, today known as the Minckwitzscher Weinberg, first married to Johanna Sophia née Erndel;
3. Christian August Fischer (died September 1739), Royal Polish and Electoral Saxon State Bursar, Chamber Assistant and Mining Councillor, husband of Christina Sophia née Erndel;
4. the Royal Polish and Electoral Saxon Appointed Coin-Minter of the Upper Saxony Region, Johann Georg Schomburg (born about 1672; died October 1745 at Dresden, interred on 9 October 1745 in the Sophienkirche in Dresden) husband of Magdalena Sophia née Erndel.

=== Occupation ===
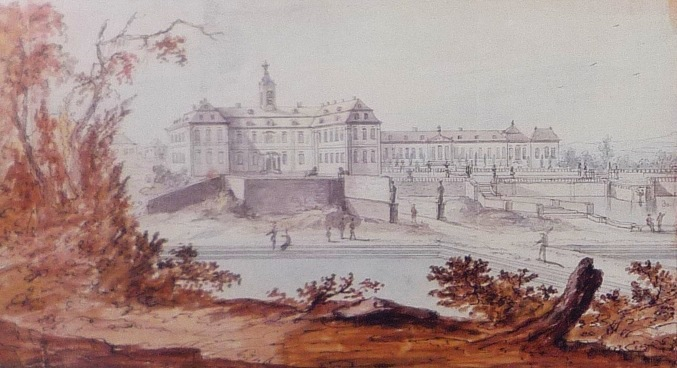
Friedrichschlößchen and Baroque Garden, Großsedlitz near Dresden, in 1723

1726 As Engineer-Captain – Area Plan of the Manor of Großsedlitz

"Beschriftet Grund-Riß / Des Ritter Gutts Groß Sedlitz / Wie solches in allen seinen Reinen und Grentzen vermö / ge derer allhier gezeichneten / Rein-Steine / Sr. Königlichen Majestät in Pohlen / und / ChurFürstlichen Durchlautigkeit zu Sachsen / und zwar denen hierzu Allergnädigste ernennten..." (Translated: Labelled Ground Plan / The Manor of Groß Sedlitz / Which same in all its Absoluteness and Borders in virtue of / the here drawn / Boundary-Stones / His Royal Majesty in Poland / and / Electoral Highness in Saxony / and namely those hereto graciously named... )

1729 As Engineer-Captain – Building Plans for the town of Dresden-Friedrichstadt

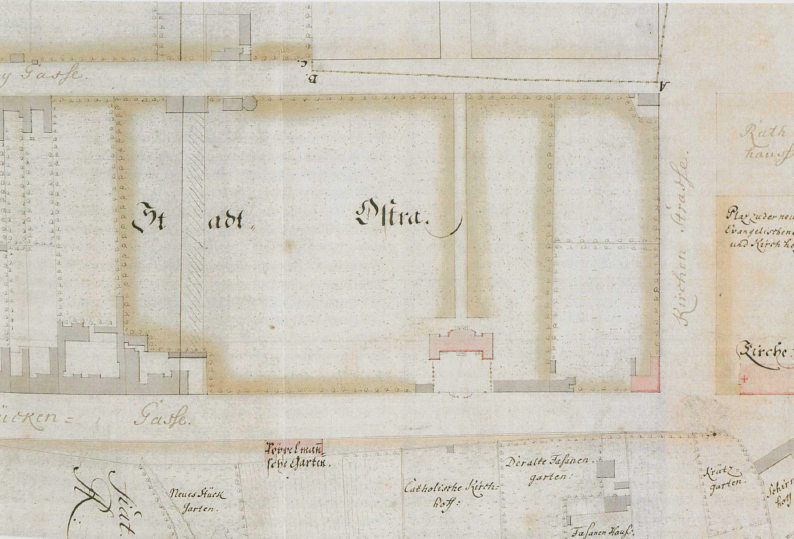
Building plan for Neu-Stadt Ostra (later named Friedrichstadt) by Christian Friedrich Erndel. "On the 28th Nov. 1729 this Ground Plan was signed by His Majesty, the King in Poland and Electoral Highness in Saxony, Lord Friedrich August II, who thereafter graciously ordered to be built the streets, as here marked in red, set out by me."

In 1670, the Elector Saxony, Johann Georg II, issued a decree that a new township should be developed between the street between the Ostrau Bridge and the barbican which had been erected in 1568 to serve the court and the fortification of Dresden, the so-called Ostra. At the behest of August the Strong, Elector of Saxony and King of Poland, in 1729 the Engineer-Captain Christian Friedrich Erndel drew up a Building Plan, giving the desired regularity to the growing suburb using a uniform street grid. A year later, the Elector declared the Ostra settlement to be named "Neustadt" (abbreviated to NeuOstra), next to the similar-named suburb of Altendresden on the right side of the Elbe, which was formed in 1685, "Neuen Königsstadt" (abbreviated to Neustadt).

1734 Under the direction of General Lieutenant von Bodt, Erndel wrote a report about the defence building works required for the Stolpen Fortress

1735 Major of the Corps of Engineers under Lieutenant-General von Bodt

1742 Promotion to Lieutenant-Colonel

1743 Promotion to Engineer-Colonel (on 24 December)

1744 As Lieutenant-Colonel - the Elbe (Augustus) Bridge

In 1744, during the Austrian War of Succession, as there was the threat of a second Silesian war, the Elbbrücke was placed in a state of defense for the third time. On the specification of the Engineer-Colonel Erndel, a five cubit high earth traverse was placed at a right-angle over the crucifix shaft in track-like fashion in the direction of the Altstadt, to Neustadt, covered, however, quite perpendicularly with a strong brick wall. Ten cubits from this wall an earthwork was erected, covered by a 4½ cubit high brick wall, which was allowed to run to the level to Neustadt. Thereby was created, over the entire five arches, a formal, covered, 10 cubits wider and about 5 cubits deeper moat, over which, so as not to disturb the passage over the bridge, one laid a battle bridge, which in case of emergency could be quickly thrown off.

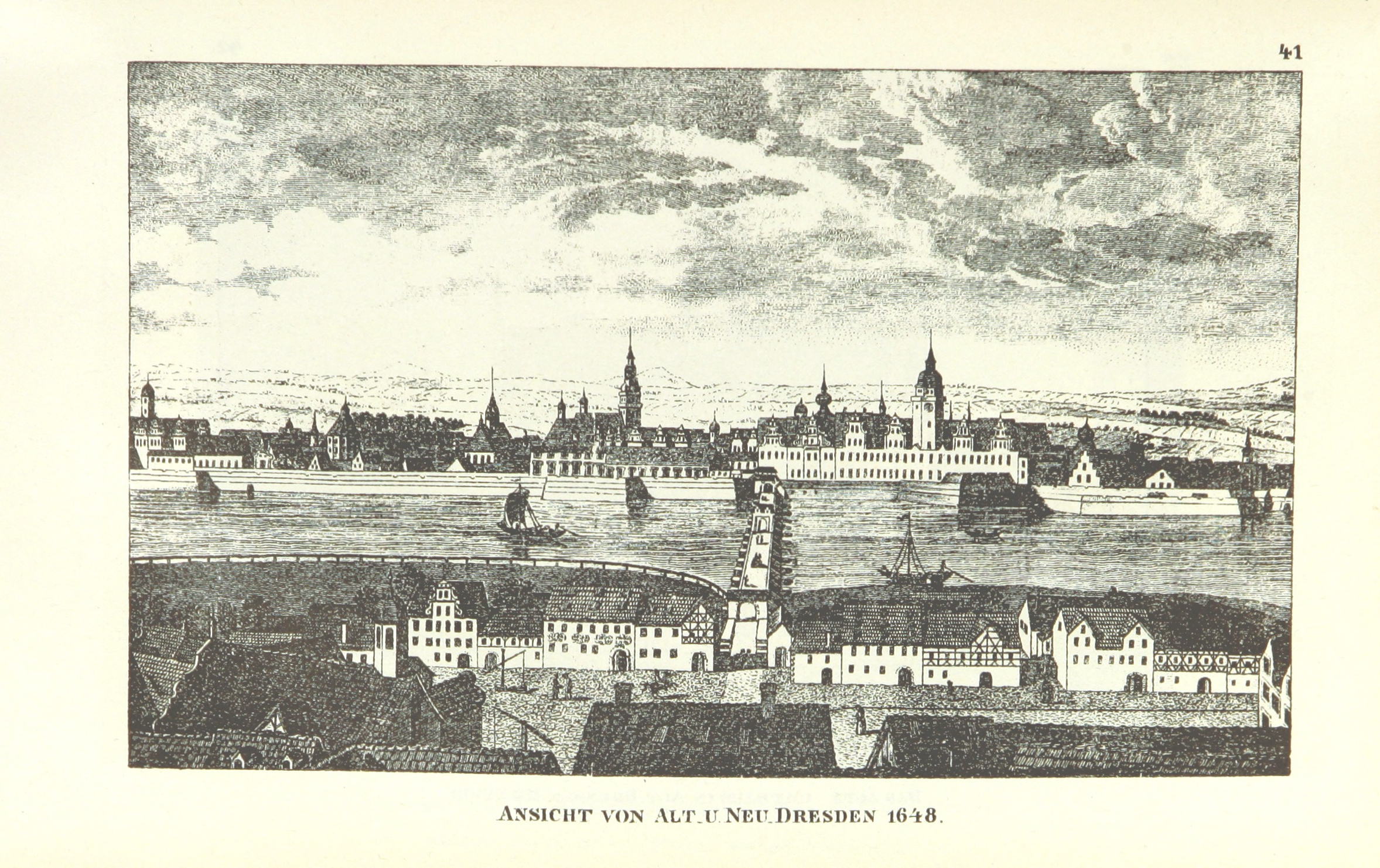
Elbe Bridge in 1648

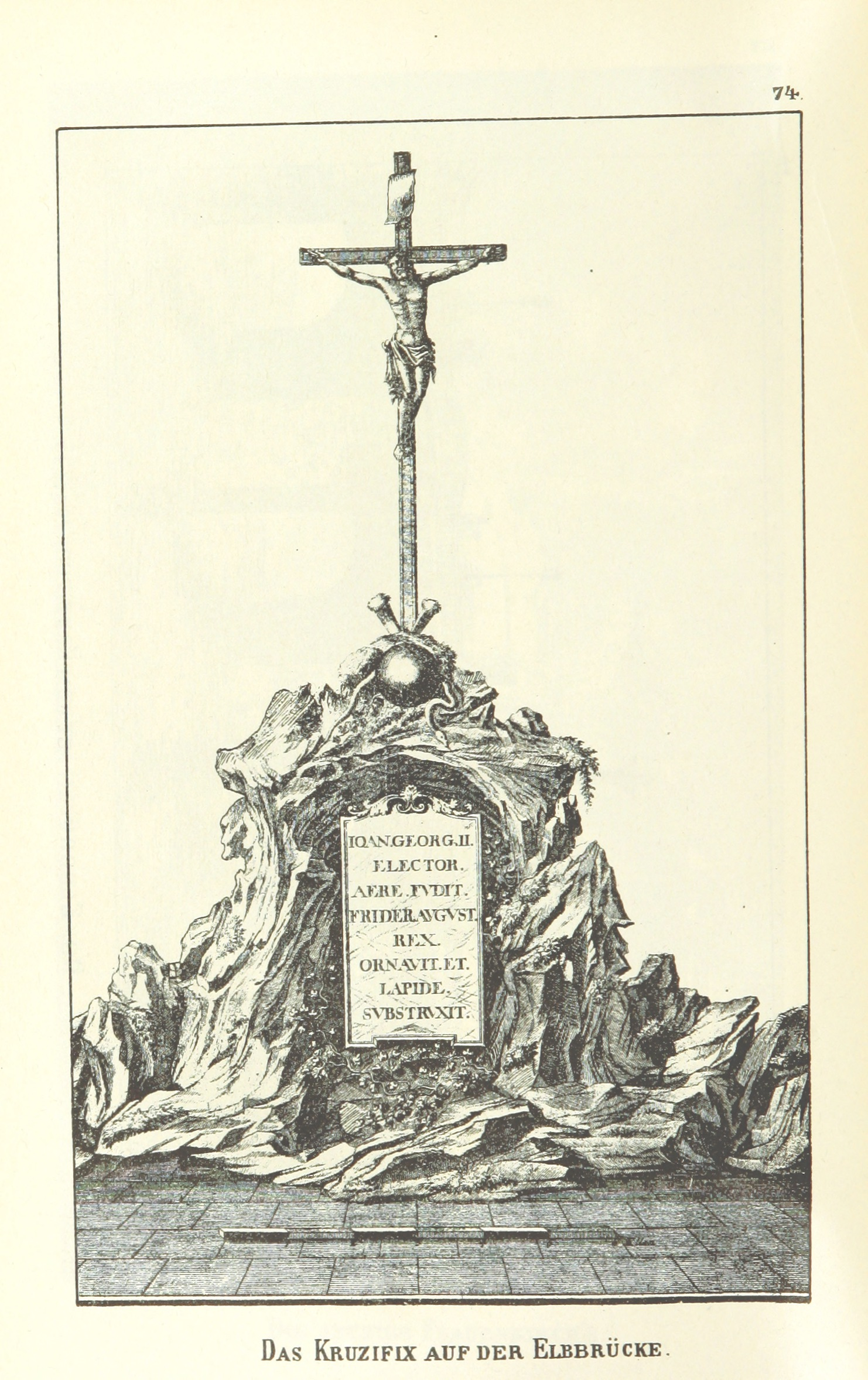
The crucifix stood on the Elbe Bridge from 1670 until the flood in 1845.

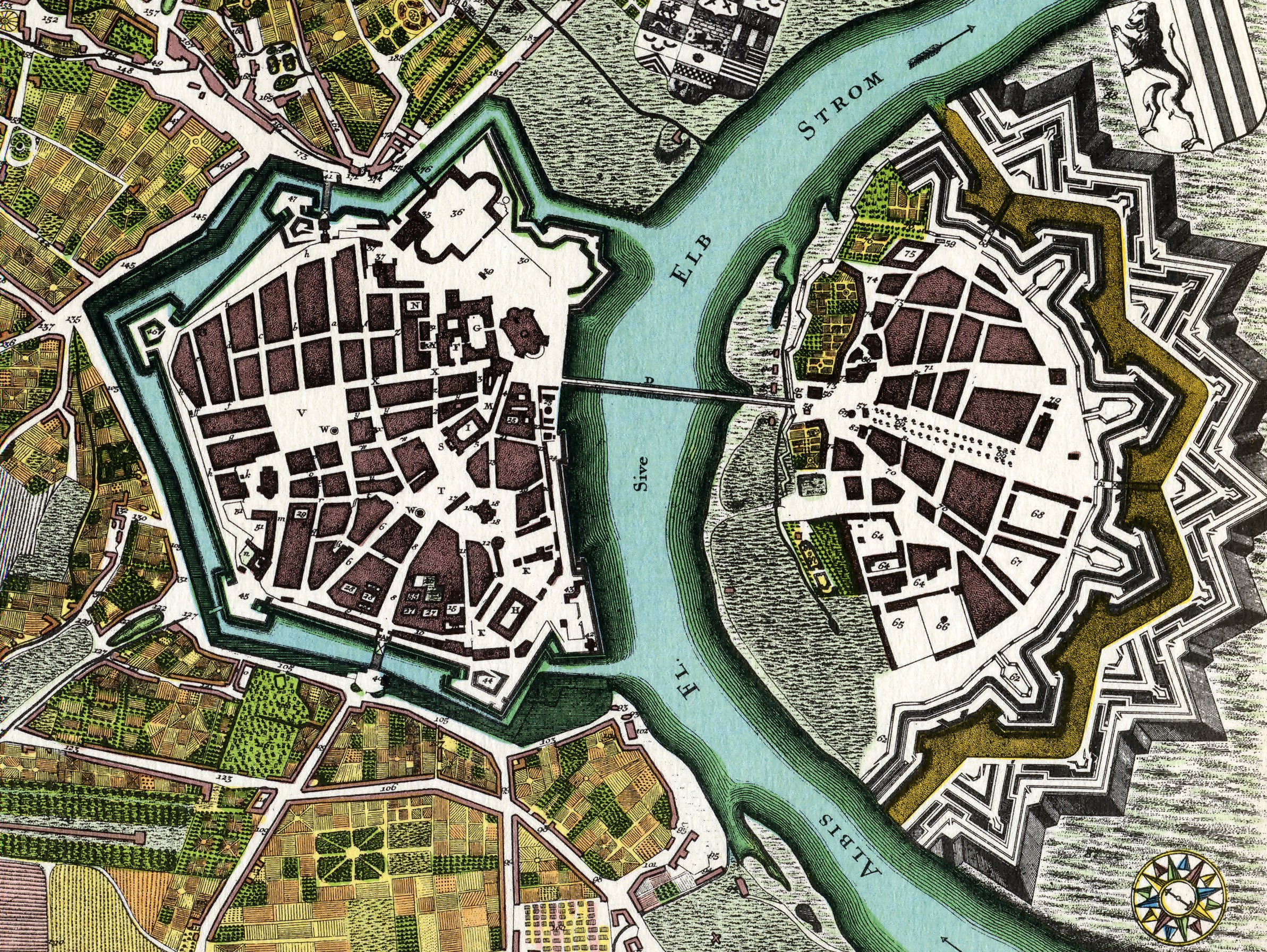
The only connection in about 1750 between Dresden and the former Altendresden (today called Dresden-Neustadt)

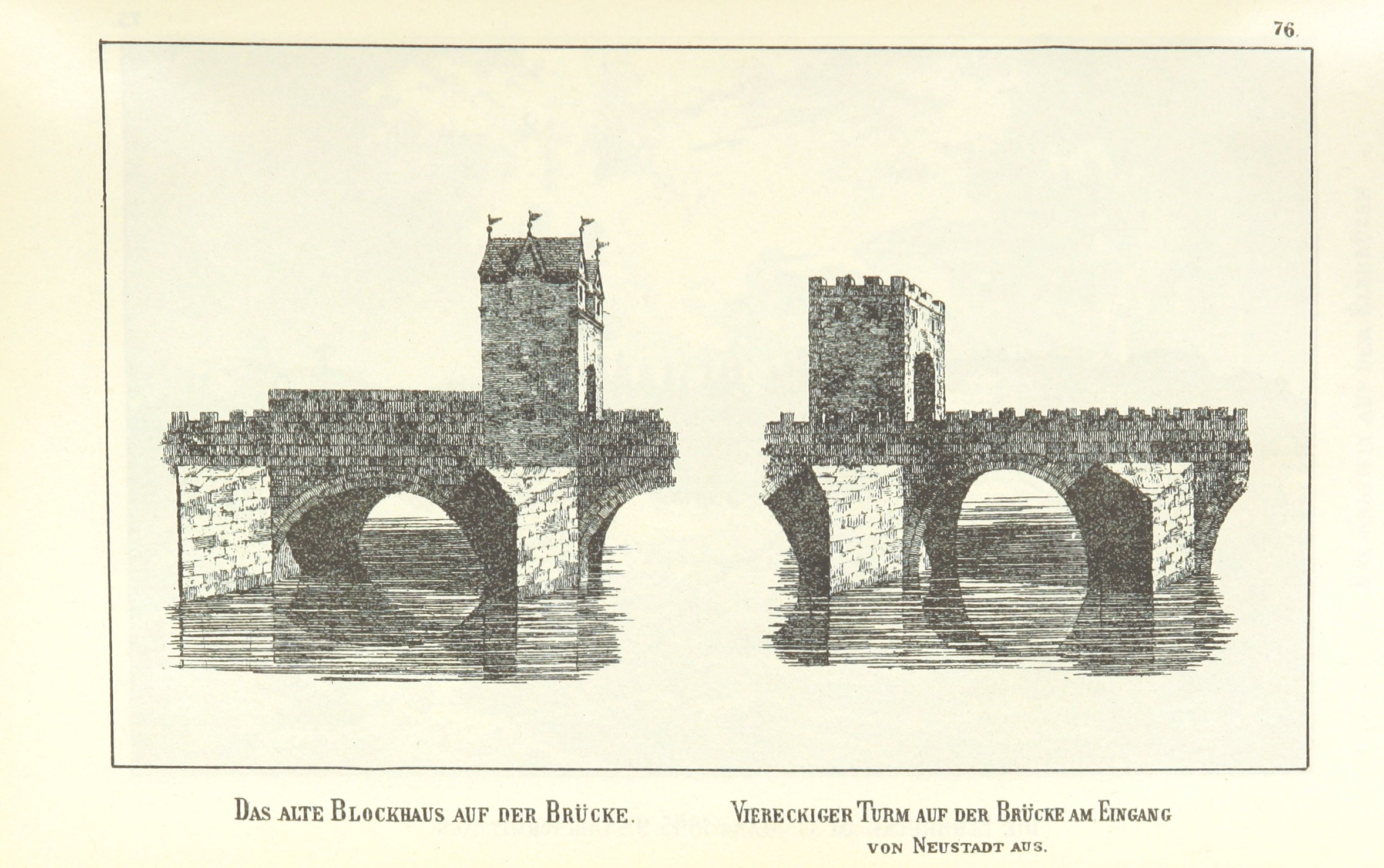
Blockhouses on the Elbe Bridge

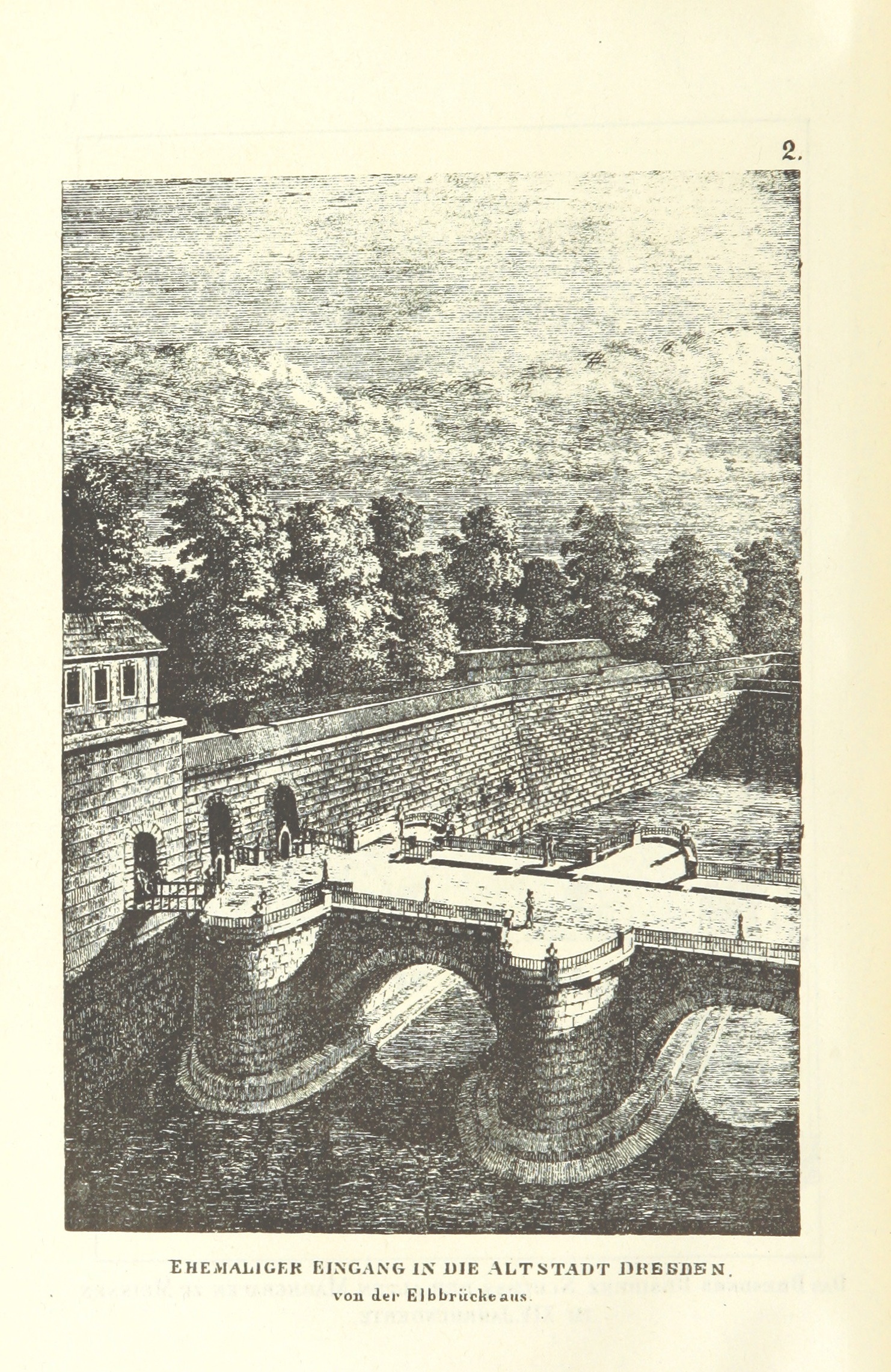
Former entrance to the Altstadt of Dresden seen from the Elbe Bridge

1751 Promotion to Major General of the Engineer Corps

Erndel loyally served the Royal Electoral House of Saxony for more than fifty years and died at his home in Dresden-Neustadt on 23 January 1767. With his passing, his paternal line was extinguished. He was buried on 28 January 1767 in the Fischer family's vault at the Alter Annenfriedhof cemetery in Dresden. Having died intestate, his worldly goods were inherited by the children of his three predeceased sisters.

== Bibliography ==
- Schaefer, Wilhelm. Chronik der Dresdener Elbbrücke, nebst den Annalen der größten Elbfluthen von der frühesten bis auf die neuste Zeit. (in German) Adler & Dietze, 1848.
- Bechter, Barbara. "Der Brühlsche Garten in Dresden-Friedrichstadt". (in German) Die Gartenkunst, 19 (2007), 1, pp. 1–46.
- "Die 'Military Revolution' und der deutsche Territorialstaat unter besonderer Berücksichtigung Brandenburg-Preußens und Sachsens Determinanten der Staatskonsolidierung im europäischen Kontext 1670-1740". (in German) Inaugural-Dissertation zur Erlangung des Doktorgrads der Philosophie des Fachbereichs 05 der Justus-Liebig-Universität Gießen vorgelegt von Thomas Wollschläger M.A. aus Halle a.d. Saale im Jahre 2002; Herstellung und Verlag: Books on Demand GmbH, Norderstedt, ISBN 3-8334-2139-8
