= Christian Heinrich Erndel =

Christian Heinrich Erndel (1676 – 17 March 1734) was a Royal Polish and Electoral Saxon Personal Physician of August the Strong. He was also a botanist and meteorologist in Dresden and Warsaw.

== Life ==
=== Family ===
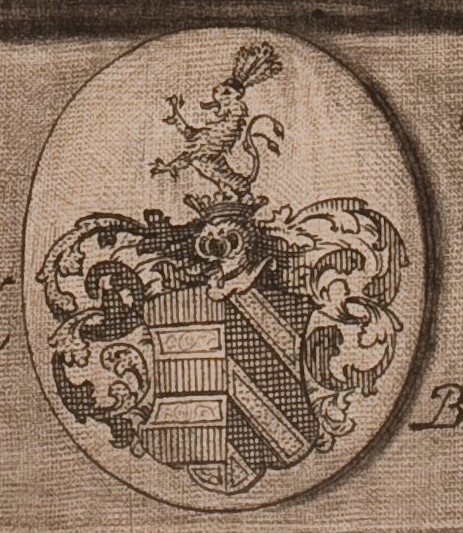
Erndel Coat of Arms

Christian Heinrich Erndel (also Erndl, Erndtel) was the seventh of twelve children, born in 1676 in Dresden. His parents were Dr. Heinrich III. Erndel (born 17 June 1638 in Dresden, died 13 September 1693 in Dresden, buried in the Kirche zu unser lieben Frauen there), lord of the manors of Berreuth near Dippoldiswalde and Mulda near Freiberg, Royal Polish and Electoral Saxon Personal Physician, married since 4 September 1665 in Dresden to Sophia Elisabeth Erndel née Ratke (born 8 July 1642 in Dresden; died 10 June 1685 in Berreuth, a daughter of Martin Ratke, Privy Chamberlain of Johann Georg I, Elector of Saxony and Johann Georg II, Elector of Saxony. Having lost both his parents at a young age, his legal guardian was Johannes Seebisch (born 12 December 1634 in Zwickau; died 1700 in Dresden), who, in 1670, was the archdeacon of the Kreuzkirche and in 1697 the City Minister (Stadtprediger) in Dresden. Erndel's paternal grandfather, Dr. Heinrich II. Erndel (born 7 April 1595 in Regensburg; died 25 July 1646 in Oschersleben, interred in the church there) was the Personal Physician to Johann Georg I, Elector of Saxony. Great-grandfather Heinrich I. Erndel (baptised on 15 July 1569 in Regensburg; interred on 15 July 1623 in the church in Wolfenbüttel), was the Personal and Court Apothecary in Prague to Rudolf II, Holy Roman Emperor (died 1612) and Matthias, Holy Roman Emperor (died 1619) who awarded him a Nobility Diploma in 1617. His sister Maria Erndl was the wife of Andreas Raselius Ambergensis and their father was Matthis 'Mattäus' Erndl, the Apothecary at the Kohlenmarkt - later known as the Mohrenapotheke in Regensburg.

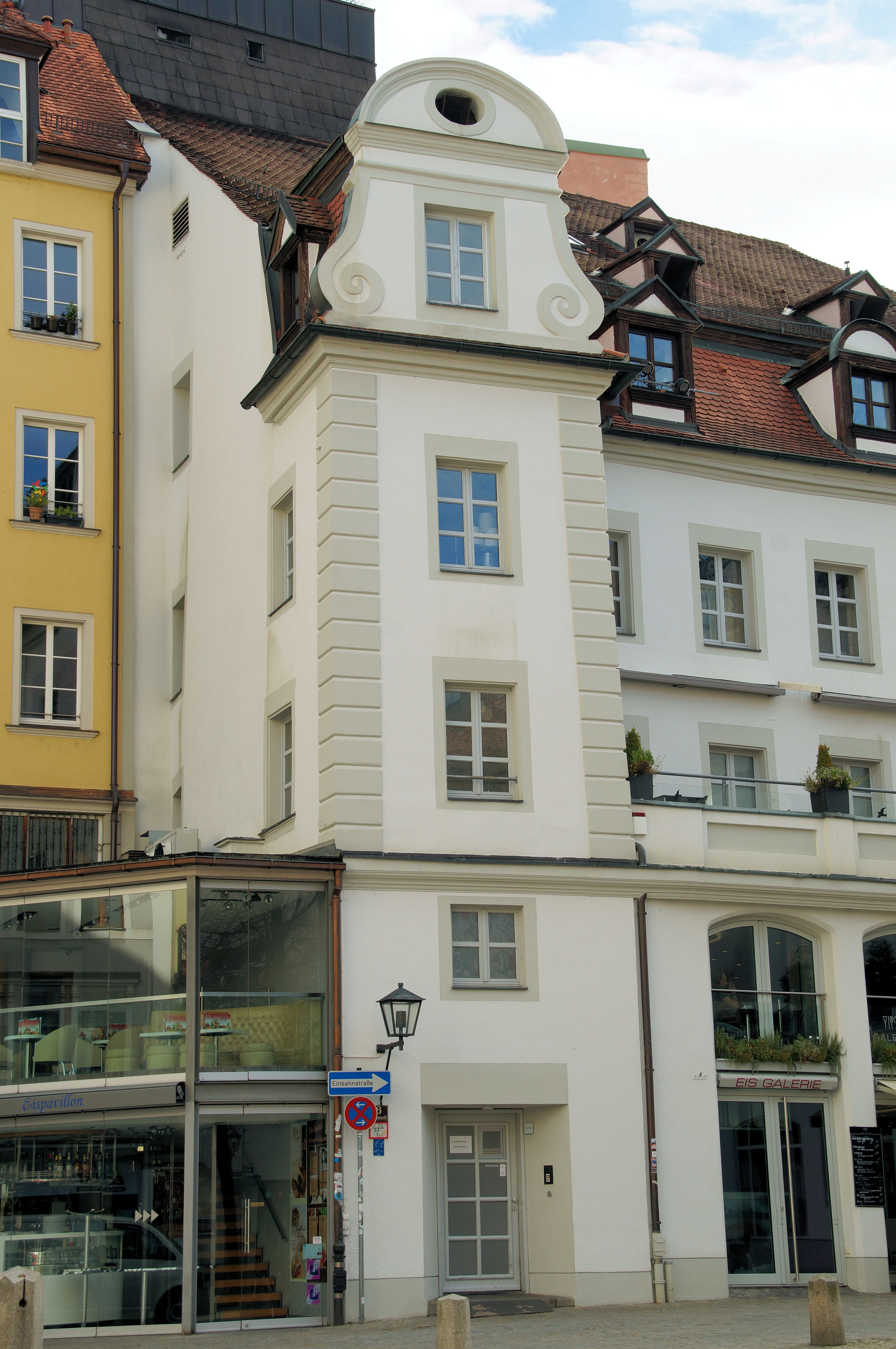
Kohlenmarkt 6 in Regensburg, until 1860 housed the Mohrenapotheke

Erndel's Poem of Mourning for his departed father read as follows:

“I have until now never seen anyone of this world die, And must - Oh! First see it happen to my Father!“

As an orphan, both he and his brother, destined to be a major-general, Christian Friedrich Erndel, were placed under the legal guardianship of Johannes Seebisch (born 12 December 1634 in Zwickau; died 1700 in Dresden), in 1670 archdeacon of the Kreuzkirche and in 1697 City Minister (Stadtprediger) in Dresden.

Erndel's brothers-in-law were:

1. Johann George Seidel (born 18 February 1658 at Zschopau; died 13 April 1739 at Meißen, interred in the St. Afra Church in Meißen, where he had been a Deacon for many years), husband of Maria Sophia née Erndel;
2. the advocate Dr. jur. Caspar Christian Kober (born 9 July 1663 at Naumburg; died 11 September 1738 at Dresden), interred in the Church at Kötzschenbroda, where he owned a vineyard today known as the Minckwitzscher Weinberg, first married to Johanna Sophia née Erndel;
3. Christian August Fischer (died September 1739), Royal Polish and Electoral Saxon State Bursar, Chamber Assistant and Mining Councillor, husband of Christina Sophia née Erndel;
4. the Royal Polish and Electoral Saxon Appointed Coin-Minter of the Upper Saxony Region, Johann Georg Schomburg (born about 1672; died October 1745 at Dresden, interred on 9 October 1745 in the Sophienkirche in Dresden) husband of Magdalena Sophia née Erndel.

Erndel's wife, Dorothee Salome, died in the Schloßgaße in Dresden and was interred in the Catacombs of the Frauenkirche on 7 September 1755. She was 48 years old and had been a widow for more than 21 years. The couple had no children.

=== Career ===
==== Education ====
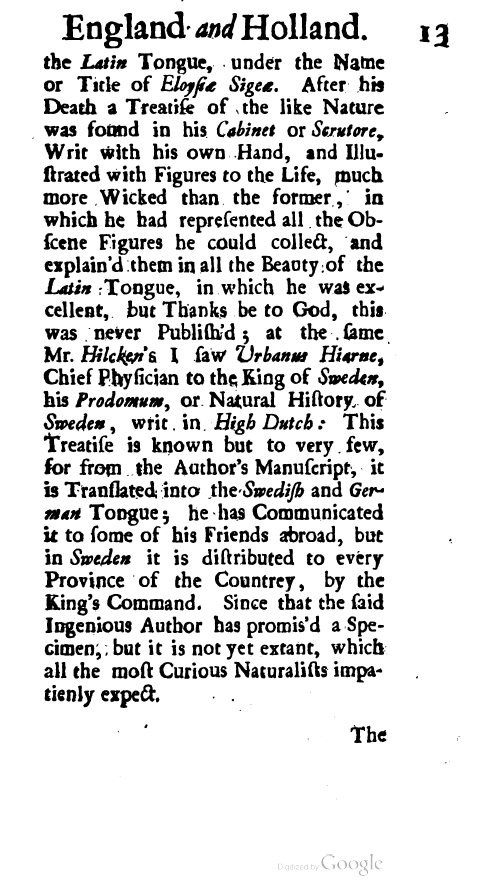
Relation of a Journey (1706-7) Mr. Hilcken & Swedish Royal Personal Physician Hiarne

A year and two months after his father's death, Christian Heinrich Erndelius Dresdensis graduated on 16 November 1694 at Wittenberg University. Thereafter, he studied at Altdorf University, from which he graduated in 1699. On 10 February 1700 Erndel's Leipzig University dissertation, written in Latin, Dissertationem De Usu Historiae Naturalis Exotico-Geographicae In Medicina, Consensu Inclytissimae Facultatis Philosophicae Lipsiensis, Ad d. X. Februarii A.R.S. M.DCC. Publicae Eruditorum Censurae subiicit, Christianus Henricus Erndl/ Dresdensis ... Respondente Daniele Kießling/ Budissa-Lus. was published. In Leipzig, on 23 September 1701, he read pro loco for admission to the Faculty of Medicine: Disp. med. ex veneno salutem sistens. Thereafter, he graduated.

==== Personal Physician ====
Erndel was a Personal Physician to the King of Poland and Elector of Saxony August the Strong. He worked in Dresden and Warsaw.

==== European Tour ====
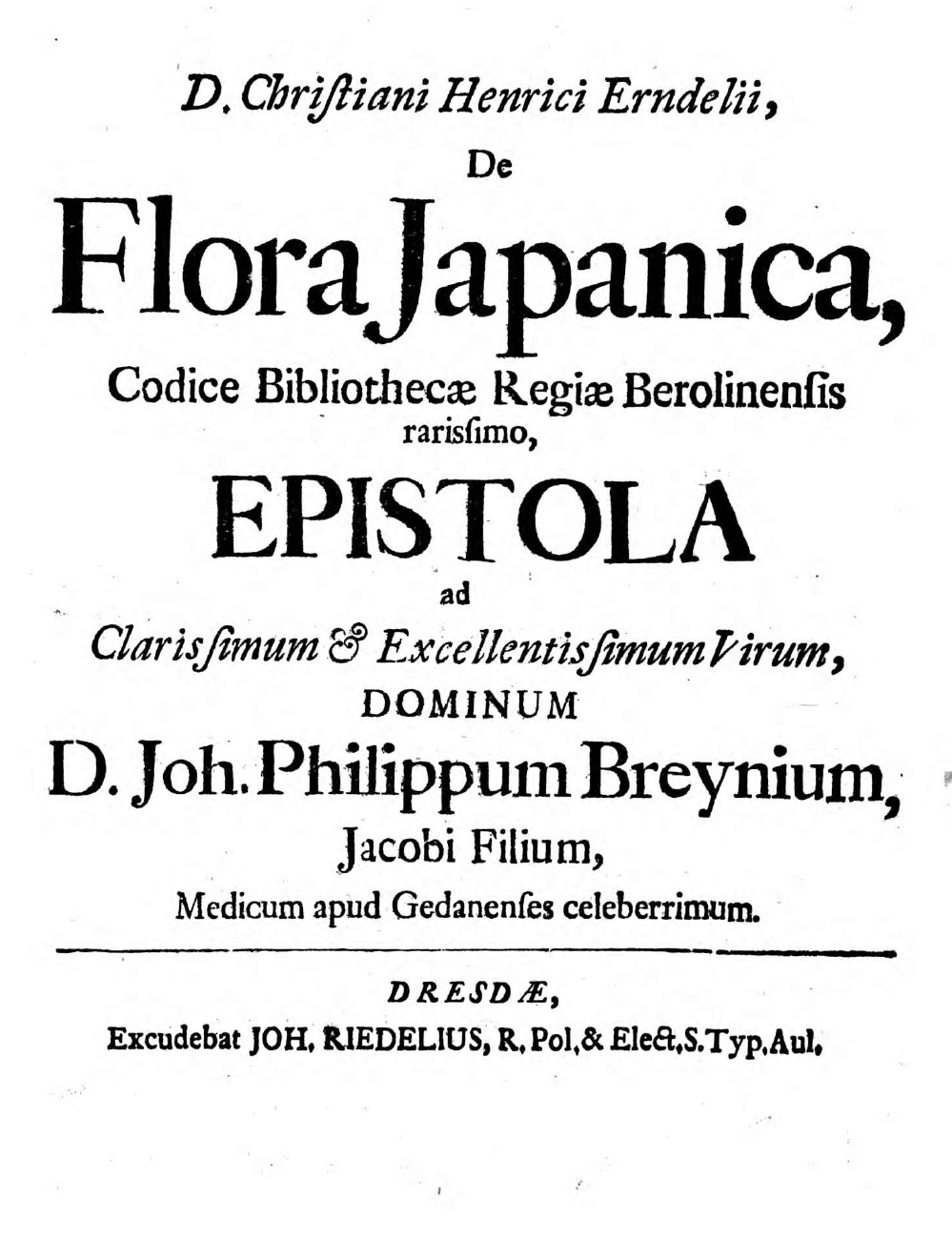
De flora Japanica (1716)

Erndel described his experiences during his travels to England and Holland in his book written in Latin: Relatio de itinere suo Anglico et Batavo 1706–7 (published in Dresden in 1710), which was later translated into English as The Relation of a Journey Into England and Holland, in the Years, 1706 and 1707. By a Saxon Physician. He wrote enthusiastically, including about a visit to his relative in Hamburg Christoph Wilhad Hilcken, (born 1664 in Hamburg; died 16 December 1717 in Hamburg), who was a judge at the Lower Court in Hamburg, the Senior Secretary of the free and Hanseatic City of Hamburg and member of the Fruitbearing Society. In 1699 Hilcken was chosen to be an executor of the estate of Vincent Placcius (born 7 February 1642 in Hamburg; died 6 April 1699 in Hamburg; lawyer, librarian, pedagogue, philosopher author, Professor at the Akademischen Gymnasium) and in 1704 donated his collection of more than 4,000 books to the Hamburg City Library. Hilcken's wife, Christina Maria Hilcken née Daurer (born 4 October 1686 in Stockholm; died 9 July 1715 in Hamburg), was Erndel's 2nd cousin once removed. Through Hilcken, he met the Swedish King's personal physician Urbanus Hiarne during his stay.

==== Naturalist ====
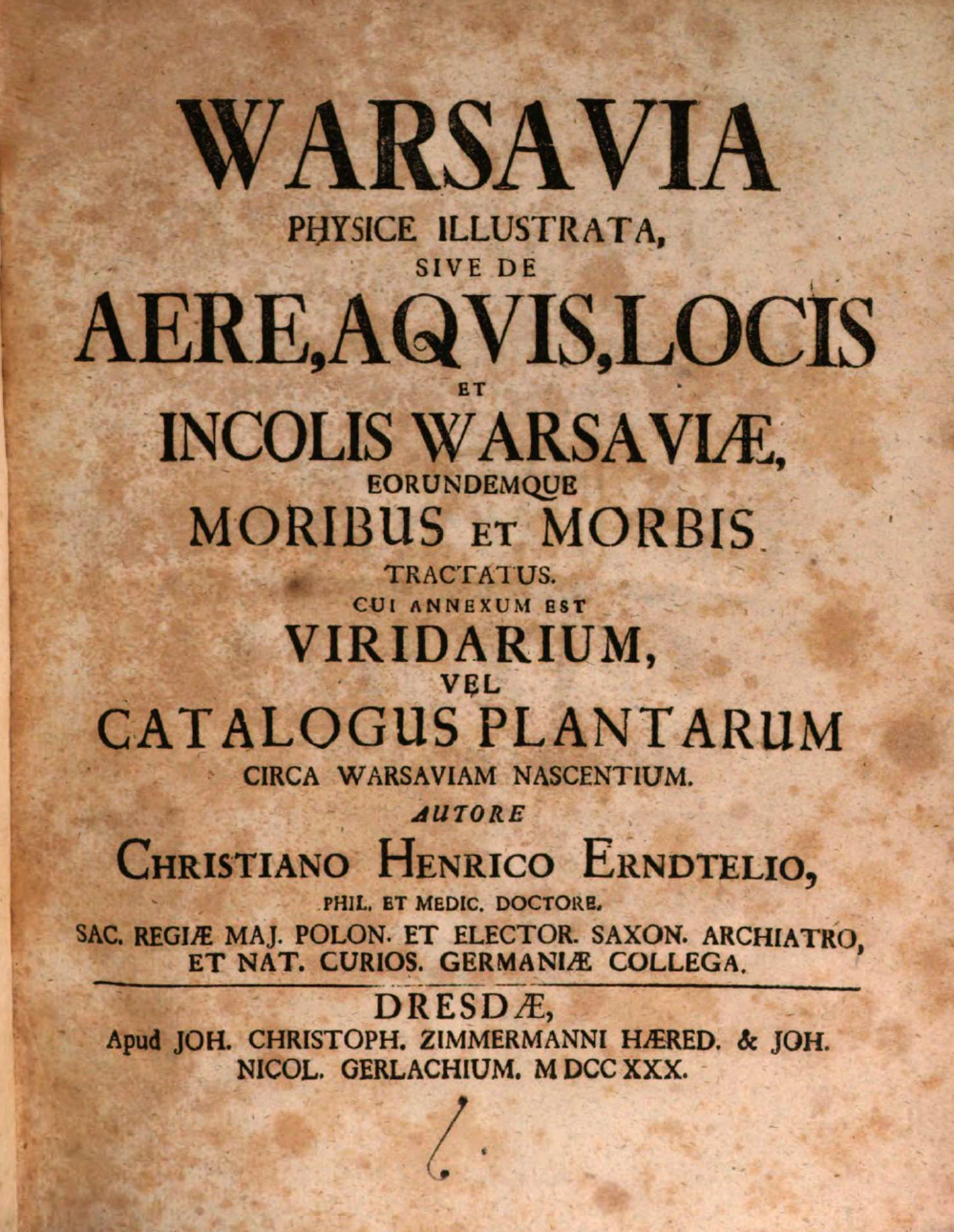
Warsavia Physice Illustrata (1730)

De flora Japonica, Codice bibliothecae Regiae Berolinensis rarissi was published by Erndel in Dresden in 1716. Thereafter, he moved to Warsaw. Parallel to caring for the monarch's health, Erndel ran a private practice in Warsaw and carried out research in to nature. Apart from his general description of the city, his special area of interest was the flora in the vicinity of Warsaw, especially those on the banks of the Vistula. He collated and published his many years of observations and descriptions of nature in his book, printed in Dresden in 1730, Warsavia Physice Illustrata, Sive De Aere, Aquis, Locis Et Incolis Warsaviae, Eorundemque Moribus Et Morbis Tractatus; Cui Annexum Est Viridarium, Vel Catalogus Plantarum Circa Warsaviam Nascentium

Warsavia Physice illustrata was the first ever treatise on this subject. The index to plants which Erndel created included more than 900 species. One of the passages concerns the first documented palaeontological studies, which he performed on the banks of the Vistula. The fossils of prehistoric animals that were discovered then, were sent to Dresden, where they formed the core of one of the collections displayed in the Zwinger Palace. He also described his experiences in Warsaw in the accompaniment of August the Strong.

In 1733 Erndel published De plantis circa thermos Teplicenes crescentibus, in the third volume of the Processes of the Academy of the Curiosity of Nature, a catalogue of plants growing in the vicinity of Teplice in Bohemia.

==== First Meteorologist in Warsaw ====
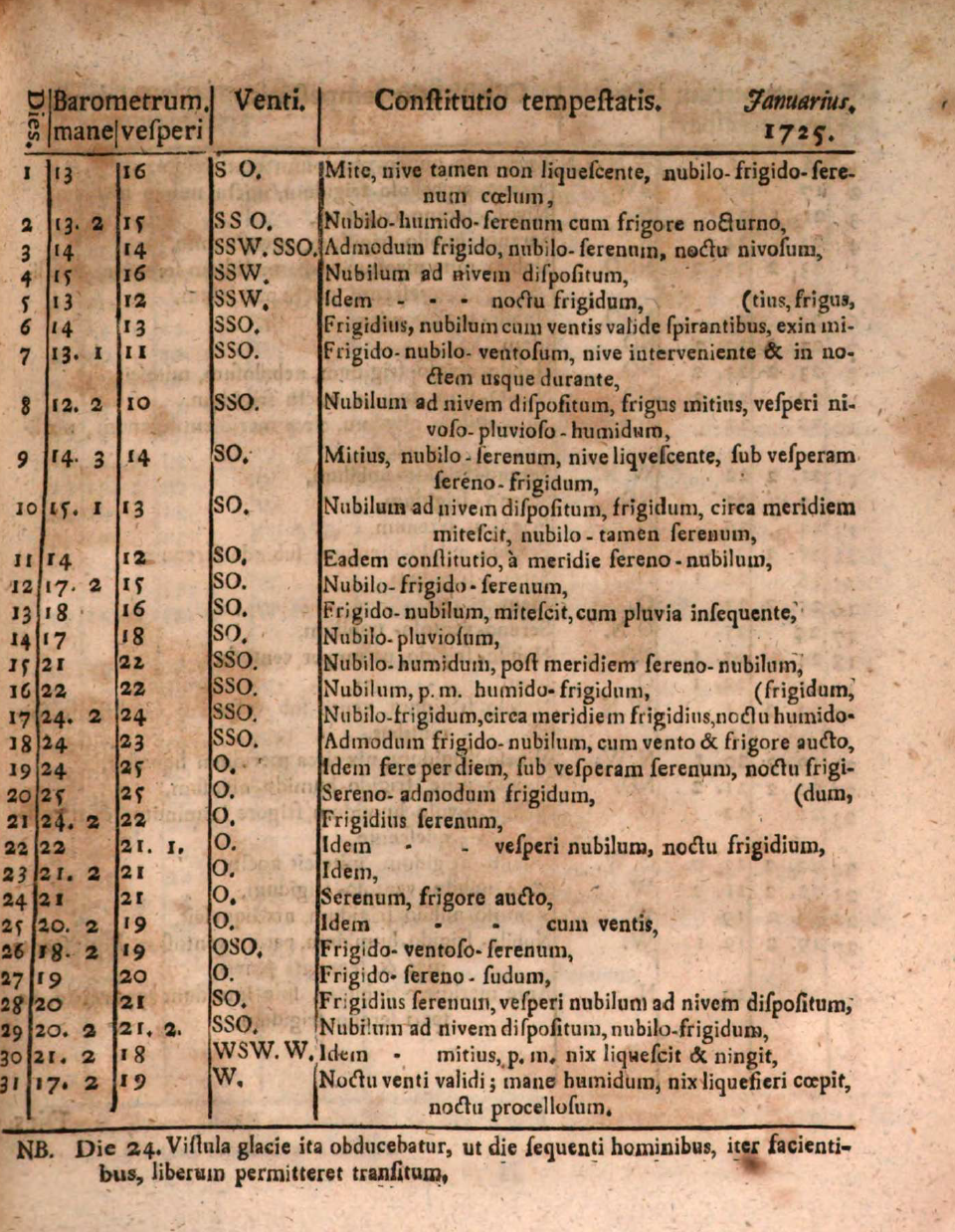
Warsaw Meteorological Data, January 1725

Erndel was also the first to introduce systematic weather observations in Warsaw. The daily measurements listed by him for air pressure, temperature, wind and clouds during the four-year period from 1725 to 1728, were the first statistics of this nature in the history of the city.

==== Demise ====
Erndel left Warsaw in 1730, returning to his place of birth, Dresden. On 17 March 1734 he died as a result of a haemorrhage and was interred on 21 March 1734 in the Fischer family's vault near the Wilsdruffer Tor in the Alter Annenfriedhof cemetery.

== Awards ==
In 1716 Erndel was elected to membership of the Leopoldina Academy of Sciences.

== Works ==
- Dissertationem De Usu Historiae Naturalis Exotico-Geographicae In Medicina, Consensu Inclytissimae Facultatis Philosophicae Lipsiensis, Ad d. X. Februarii A.R.S. M.DCC. Publicae Eruditorum Censurae... - Scholvinius: Lipsiae. 1700.
- Disputatio Medica [!] Ex Veneno Salutem sistens, Quam Indultu Gratiosissimæ Facultatis Medicæ, Pro Loco In eadem suo tempore otinendo, defendcet D. XXIII. Septembr. M. DCCI. ... Christianus Henricus Erndl, Dresdensis, Philos. & Medic. Doctor, Respondente Tobia Taut, Gedanensi., Christian Heinrich Erndtel; Wilhelm Ludwig Daser; Tobias Taut, Lipsiae Scholvien. 1701.
- C. H. E. D. De Itinere Suo Anglicano Et Batavo Annis MDCCVI et MDCCVII Facto Relatio Ad Amicum D. G. K. A. C. Erndtel, Christian Heinrich. [S.l.] : 1710 (The relation of a journey into England and Holland, in 1706, and 1707. 1711 By Ch. Ed. Physician in ordinary to the King of Poland). 1710.
- De flora Japonica, Codice bibliothecae Regiae Berolinensis rarissi. 1716.
- Warsavia Physice Illustrata, Sive De Aere, Aquis, Locis Et Incolis Warsaviae, Eorundemque Moribus Et Morbis Tractatus; Cui Annexum Est Viridarium, Vel Catalogus Plantarum Circa Warsaviam Nascentium. 1730.
- De plantis circa thermos Teplicenes crescentibus. (Historisch-biographisches Handwörterbuch der denkwürdigsten, berühmtesten und berüchtigsten Menschen aller Stände, Zeiten und Nationen. Von Karl Florentin Leidenfrost, Zweiter Band, Can–Gz. Ilmenau 1824, Gedruckt und verlegt bei Bernhard Friedrich Voigt. Seite 362) und (Biographie médicale, Band 2 von Antoine Laurent Jessé Bayle, Paris, 1841; Seite 377: Erndtel a publié en 1733, dans le troisieme volume des actes de l’Academie des Curieux de la nature, un catalogue des plantes qui croissent pres de Toeplitz.) 1733.

== Literature ==
- Johann Daniel Ferdinand Neigebaur: Geschichte der kaiserlichen Leopoldino-Carolinischen deutschen Akademie der Naturforscher während des zweiten Jahrhunderts ihres Bestehens. Friedrich Frommann, Jena 1860, S. 207.
