= Anna Alojza Ostrogska =

Polish noblewoman (1600–1654)

- Princess
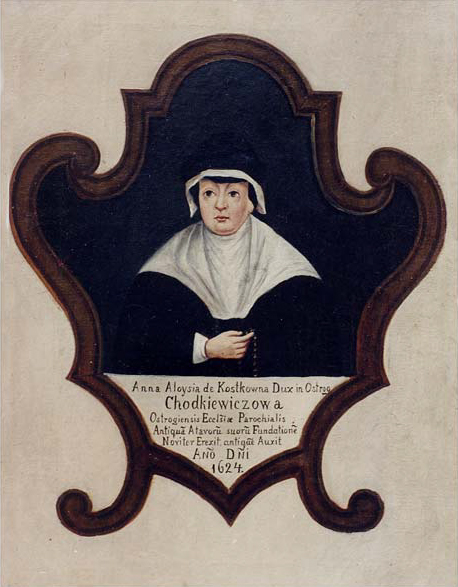
- Coat of arms: Ostrogski
- Full name: Anna Alojza ks. Ostrogska h. własnego
- Born: 1600; Jarosław
- Died: 1654 (aged 53–54); Greater Poland
- Family: Ostrogski
- Spouse: Jan Karol Chodkiewicz h. Kościesza
- Father: Oleksander Ostrogski h. Ostrogski
- Mother: Anna Kostka h. Dąbrowa

Anna Alojza Ostrogska
- Coat of arms
- Noble family: Ostrogski

Princess Anna Alojza Ostrogska (1600–1654) was a Polish noblewoman and heiress, known for her great fortune, and famously pious and ascetic lifestyle.

Anna was daughter of voivode of Wołyń Price Oleksander Ostrogski h. Ostrogski, the son of voivode of Kijów (Kyiv, also Kiev) Prince Konstanty Wasyl Ostrogski h. Ostrogski and Countess Zofia Tarnowska h. Leliwa and Anna Kostka h. Dąbrowa, the daughter of Jan Kostka h. Dąbrowa and Zofia Odrowąż h. Odrowąż.

== Marriage and issue ==
Anna Alojza married Hetman Jan Karol Chodkiewicz h. Kościesza on 28 November 1620 in Jarosław. They had no children.

== Bibliography ==
- Wanda Dobrowolska: Chodkiewiczowa z ks. Ostrogskich Anna Alojza. W: Polski Słownik Biograficzny. T. 3: Brożek Jan – Chwalczewski Franciszek. Kraków: Polska Akademia Umiejętności – Skład Główny w Księgarniach Gebethnera i Wolffa, 1937, s. 370–371. Reprint: Zakład Narodowy im. Ossolińskich, Kraków 1989, ISBN 83-04-03291-0.
- Tomasz Jurasz: Karoca
- Jerzy Antoni Kostka: Kostkowie herbu Dąbrowa. Wyd. Z.P. POLIMER Koszalin 2010, ISBN 978-83-89976-40-6.
- Testament Anny Alojzy z Ostrogskich Chodkiewiczowej, [w:] Testamenty szlacheckie z ksiąg grodzkich wielkopolskich z lat 1631–1655, Poznań – Wrocław 2008.
