= Konstanty Wasyl Ostrogski =

Ruthenian magnate (1526–1608)

Saint Kostiantyn-Vasyl Ostrozkyi
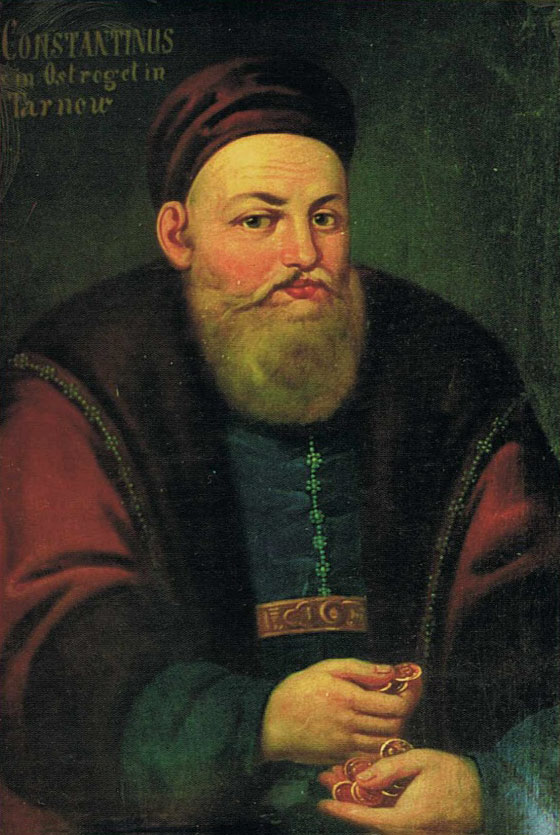
- Portrait by Teofil Kopystynsky

Right-believing
- Born: 2 February 1526; Turov or Dubno, Grand Duchy of Lithuania
- Died: 23 or 29 February 1608 (aged 82); Ostróg, Polish–Lithuanian Commonwealth
- Venerated in: Orthodox Church of Ukraine
- Canonized: 2008; 18 years ago by Ukrainian Orthodox Church - Kyiv Patriarchate
- Feast: 26 February

Voivode of Kyiv
- Reign: 1559–1608
- Predecessor: Hrehory Chodkiewicz
- Successor: Stanisław Żółkiewski
- Born: Wasyl Ostrogski
- Burial: Kyiv-Pechersk Lavra; Epiphany Church, Ostroh
- Spouse: Zofia Tarnowska
- Issue: Janusz Ostrogski; Katarzyna Ostrogska; Konstanty Ostrogski; Aleksander Ostrogski
- Father: Konstanty Ostrogski
- Mother: Aleksandra Słucka

Prince Konstanty Wasyl Ostrogski (Ruthenian: Костεньтин Ѡстрозский; Ukrainian: Костянтин-Василь Острозький, romanized: Kostiantyn-Vasyl Ostrozkyi; Belarusian: Канстантын Васіль Астрожскi; Lithuanian: Konstantinas Vasilijus Ostrogiškis; 2 February 1526 – 23 or 29 February 1608) was a Ruthenian Orthodox magnate of the Polish–Lithuanian Commonwealth, starost of Volodymyr, marshal of Volhynia and voivode of Kiev. One of the most powerful and influential figures in Ukrainian lands during the 16–17th centuries, Ostrogski became famous as founder of the Ostroh Academy and protector of Eastern Orthodox religion.

In 2008, the council of the Ukrainian Orthodox Church of the Kyiv Patriarchate proclaimed Konstanty Wasyl Ostrogski a saint and established his feast day on 26 February [O.S. 13 February].

== Biography ==
=== Early life ===
The date of birth of Konstanty Wasyl Ostrogski is disputed. According to some historians he was born around 1524/1525 or 1526. Based on historical sources, the prince's birthday is dated with 13 (O.S. 2) February. He was born either in Turów or in Dubno.

The prince's birth name was Wasyl (Basil), but starting from the 1570s he started using the name Konstanty (Constantine) in honour of his father, Lithuanian grand hetman Konstanty Ostrogski. Members of Ostrogski family considered themselves to be descendants of Rurikids. Ostrogski's mother Alexandra was a granddaughter of Mikhailo Olelkovich, prince of Slutsk and brother of Simeon Olelkovich, the last Grand Prince of Kiev, and ultimately descended from Lithuanian duke Algirdas.

After the death of his father in 1530, the young prince lived in Turov under the stewardship of his mother. His father estates were managed by his half-brother Illia Ostrogski. After the untimely death of his brother, at the age of 16 he put forward claims to his brother’s inheritance and to guardianship over his daughter from his first marriage, Yelizavieta. On the other side stood Illia’s widow, Beata née Kościelecka. The trial before the royal court continued until the end of 1541. The final division of the estate took place in 1546.

He was homeschooled, and at the age of 18 entered military service, taking part in wars against Tatars. In 1550, Ostrogski was appointed starost of Volodymyr and marshal of Volhynia. He gradually concentrated more power, presiding over local sejmiks and commanding the pospolite ruszenie.

=== Political rise ===
In 1559, king Sigismund II Augustus appointed Ostrogski Kyiv voivode; the prince would keep that post for almost half a century until his death. In 1569, he served as a representative of Kyiv Voivodeship at the Lublin Sejm, where he refused to support the separatism of Lithuanian magnates.

As a voivode, he took a prominent position in the newly created Senate, generally supporting the Polish side and distancing himself from the Lithuanian opposition represented by the Radziwiłł clan. After the death of Sigismund Augustus, Ostrogski supported the candidacy of Henry Valois, and awarded the new king with five camels at the coronation sejm. For this Henry supported the prince in his land dispute with Olbracht Łaski, as a result of which Ostrogskis gained possessions in Przemyśl, Lviv and Halych lands, as well as the city of Tarnów and several villages in Lesser Poland and Bohemia. Henry's successor Stephen Bathory confirmed Ostrogski's privileges on his landholdings. Recognized as a skilled diplomat and military man, Ostrogski gained respect for his defensive operations against the Tatars, and was even included into the list of possible pretenders on the throne at the 1587 convocation sejm. Following the death of tsar Feodor Ivanovich Ostrogski was listed among the monarch's possible successors due to his relation with Rurikids.

During his tenure in Kyiv, Ostrogski established a sloboda on the Old Kyiv hill. The prince also had connections among Zaporozhian Cossacks. One of his servants was Krzysztof Kosiński, leader of the Kosiński Uprising. Cossack leader Severyn Nalyvaiko was also a close associate of the Ostrogski family.

In the 1570s, Ostrogski waged a war against another magnate, Stanisław Tarnowski, about disputed possession of estates in the area of Tarnów, in Lesser Poland. In 1592, the prince received a royal privilege, allowing him to propose candidates for vacant church positions. Ostrogski was also known to patronize supporters of the Heresy of the Judaizers, who had moved to Volhynia fleeing persecution in Novgorod and Muscovy.

=== Opposition to the Union of Brest ===
In 1583–1584, Ostrogski took part in negotiations with Holy See representatives Antonio Possevino and Alberto Bolognetti. In a 1585 letter to the Pope he voiced his support for the union of churches, which he saw as a way of raising the status of the Orthodox community. However, Ostrogski opposed the exclusion of the Patriarchates of Moscow and Constantinople from the union project, and his position made the perspective of the union unrealistic due to the Muscovite and Ottoman hostility to Rome. In 1595 the prince strongly criticized the preliminary articles of union signed by Ipatii Potii and Kyrylo Terletsky in Torchyn, and demanded the document to be discussed at a church council with the participation of nobility. After king Sigismund III rejected his proposal, on 25 July 1595 Ostrogski issued a universal calling on all Orthodox Ruthenians to stand in protection of their "piety". In August, the prince sent his representative to the Protestant congress of Poland and Lithuania with a call to oppose the king, whom he accused of violating the part of pacta conventa providing religious freedom to his subjects.

Ostrogski's strong condemnation of the planned union caused at least one of its initial promoters, Lviv bishop Hedeon Balaban, to abandon his support for the project. As a result of Ostrogski's position, he was suspected of standing behind the events of Nalyvaiko Uprising of 1595–1596, during which Cossack rebels attacked the supporters of Lutsk bishop Terletsky, one of the proponents of the union.

At the Brest Church Council in October 1596 Ostrogski organized a separate meeting of Orthodox dignitaries. But because the local Orthodox bishop, a supporter of the Union, Hipacy Pociej, did not allow them access to any of the churches, they met in the tenement house where Ostrogski lived, which belonged to the Arian Malcher Rayski, deputy starosta of Brest. During this meeting which the representative of Constantinople Patriarchate excommunicated Michael Rohoza and other Uniate clergymen. Soon thereafter Ostrogski issued an appeal to the king, threatening him with rebellion for violating the rights of Ruthenian people. The monarch responded by proclaiming all Eastern Christians who refused to adopt the decision of Brest Council to be apostates deprived of royal protection, and ordered all church positions to be taken exclusively by Union supporters.

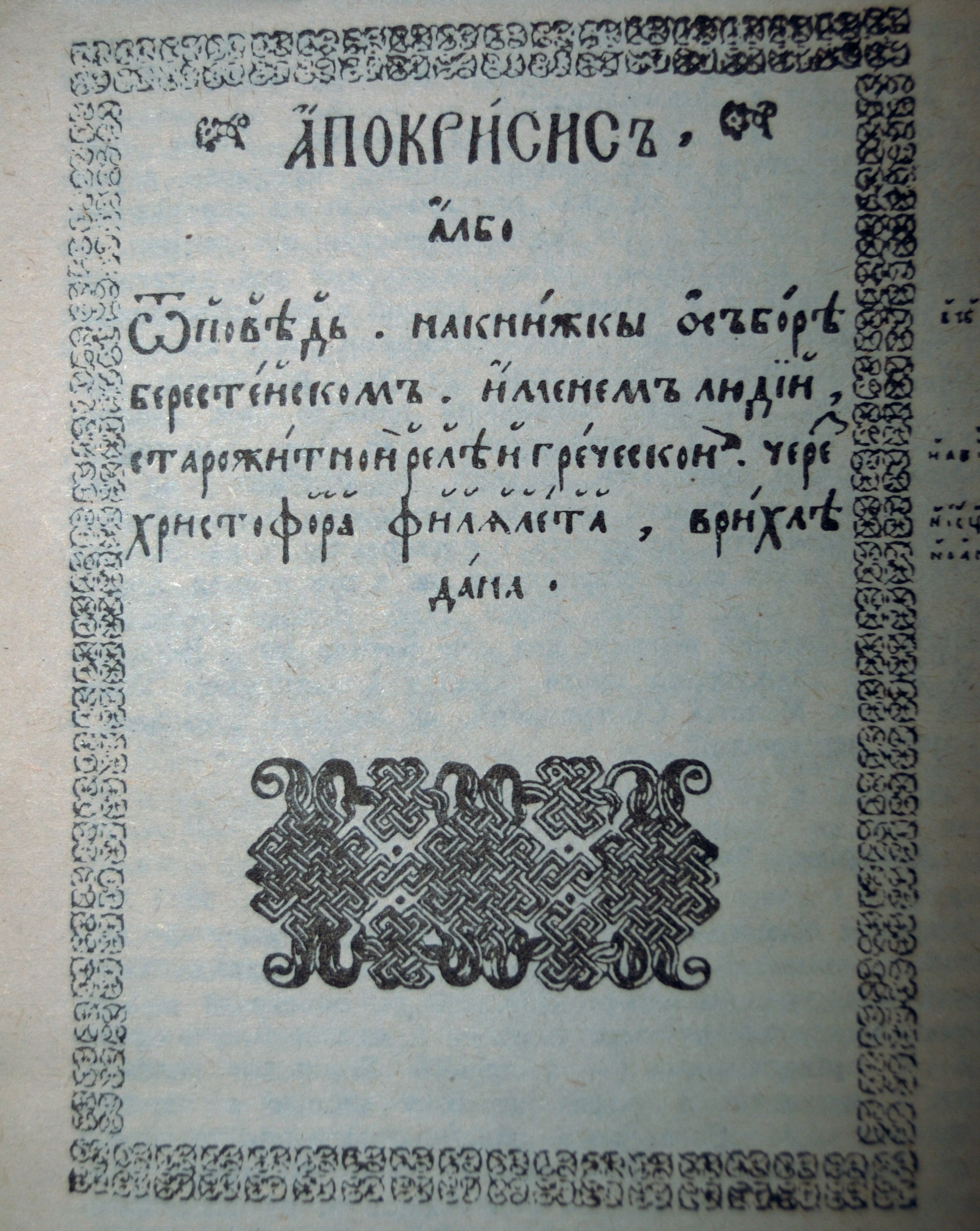
Title page of Apocrisis

In 1597–1598, Ostrogski fincanced the publication of Apocrisis, a polemic treatise authored by Polish Protestant Marcin Broniewski under the pseudonym Christophor Philaleth. Broniewski's work interpreted the Union of Brest as a violation of rights of the Ruthenian population and warned about the possibility of a civil war in the Commonwealth. Ostrogski represented anti-union forces at the Sejms of 1597 and 1599, entering a confederation with Protestants, which in 1601 proposed a project to grant positions in the Orthodox Church exclusively to non-Uniates. However, that draft was rejected by the king under the influence of pro-Catholic senators.

In advance to the Sejm of 1603, Ostrogski conducted negotiations with Krzysztof "Piorun" Radziwiłł. The active policies of the pro-Orthodox camp eventually brought success, and Kyiv Pechersk Lavra was removed from partonage of the Uniate archbishop. In 1605 the Chamber of Deputies succeeded in adopting a law restoring the Orthodox hierarchy, however it was vetoed by the king. In 1606–1607, expulsion of Jesuits and restoration of the previous status of the Orthodox Church were included into the list of demands issued to the monarch by the participants of Zebrzydowski rebellion. As a result, the king declared the freedom of worship for followers of "Greek religion" and guaranteed the appointment of Orthodox Christians to religious positions without breaking the Union. Despite this, many Orthodox episcopal sees remained vacant, and Orthodoxy remained in a weakened position in respect to the government-supported Catholic and Uniate churches.

During the Time of Troubles Ostrogski refused to help False Dmitriy I and supported Jan Zamoyski.

=== Death and inheritance ===
Ostrogski died on 29 February 1608 in Ostroh at the age of 81. On 27 April, he was buried in a crypt located inside of the castle church. He left no testament. After the death of his sons, Ostrogski's possessions were inherited by his granddaughters, who married into Zamoyski and Lubomirski families.

== Cultural activities ==
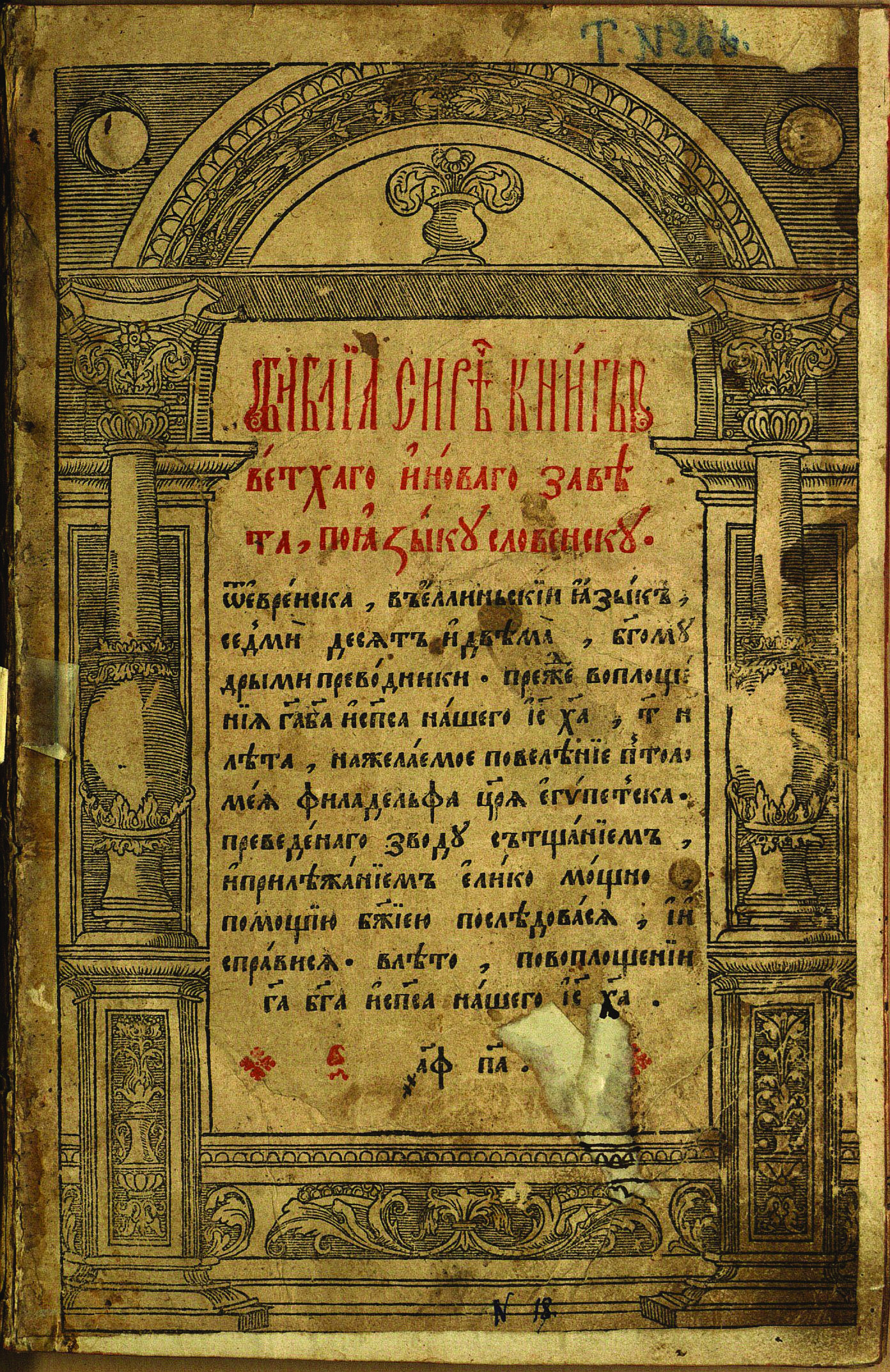
Title page of Ostroh Bible

In 1574, Ostrogski moved his main residence from Dubno to Ostroh and started rebuilding the local castle. The prince's love for church music contributed to the emergence of a special choir singing style, the so-called "Ostrog chant". His castle also possessed a big library with both Orthodox religious texts and Western European books on cosmography, grammar, Catholic and Protestant theology and reprints of ancient works.

Prince Ostrogski was of Eastern Orthodox faith and was active in supporting the Orthodox Church. He was also a promoter of Eastern Christian culture in the Polish–Lithuanian Commonwealth. In 1574, Jesuit priest Piotr Skarga challenged the prince by dedicating to him the treatise On the Unity of God's Church Under One Pastor. This provoked a response from Ruthenian scholars, and starting from 1578 a printing house was established by Ostrogski, producing theological literature directed against the possible union of Orthodox and Catholic churches.

Around 1576, Ostrogski established the Ostroh Academy, a wellregarded humanist educational and scholarship institution, with the instruction in Greek, Latin and Old Church Slavonic languages. The sum for the school's foundation was donated by Ostrogski's niece Halszka. In 1581, the academy produced and published the Ostroh Bible, the first complete printed edition of the Bible in Old Church Slavonic, which was edited by Ivan Fedorov. In 1595-1596 the academy was headed by Cyril Lucaris, the future Patriarch of Alexandria and Constantinople. During the early 17th century, Ostroh Academy served as one of the main centres of Greek studies in the Commonwealth.

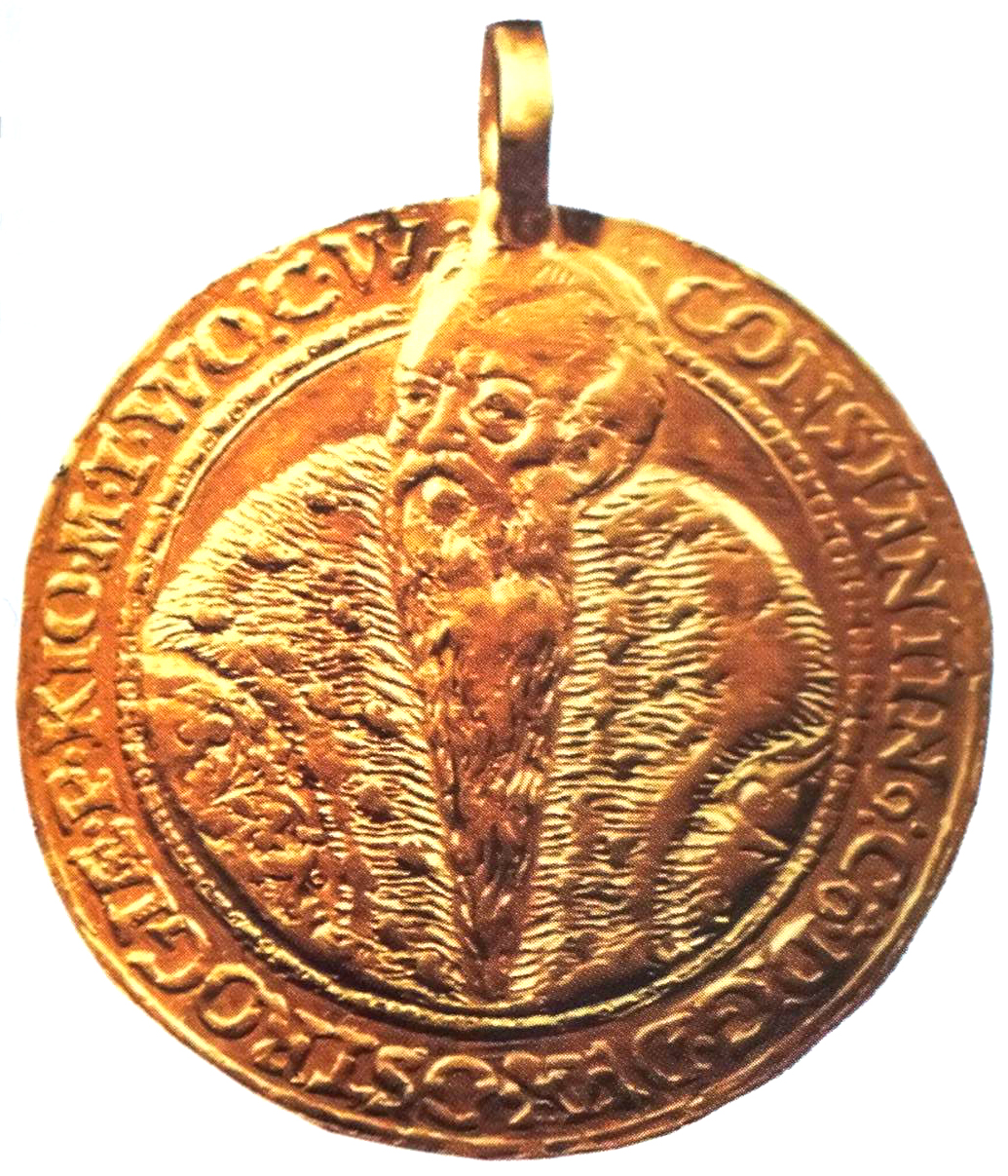
16th century medal depicting Ostrogski

Ostrogski became a protector of numerous ambitious szlachta members, many of whom stemmed from Galicia. Among them was Yelysei Pletenetskyi, descendant of a Lviv burgher family ennobled by Ostrogski, who in 1599 became archimandrite of Kyiv Pechersk Lavra, as well as Herasym Smotrytsky, the first rector of Ostroh Academy and father of Meletius Smotrytsky. Many of the academy's scientists were awarded by the prince with important church and government positions in his realm. However, Ostrogski failed to provide his academy official status, which resulted in its decline by the time of his death in 1608. In 1620, the institution was eventually transformed into a Jesuit college by one of late prince's daughters, who was a Roman Catholic.

In 1578, Ostrogski installed a marble stone on the grave of his father in the Dormition Cathedral of Kyiv Pechersk Lavra, which was destroyed during WW2 and restored in 2021. In 1898, a golden medal with the lifetime depiction of the prince was discovered in the cathedral; today it is preserved at the Hermitage Museum. In 1592, Ostrogski lobbied the issue of a royal charter recognizing the right of Lviv Brotherhood School to teach liberal arts. The prince was also a patron of the Derman Monastery located not far from his residence.

== Estates ==
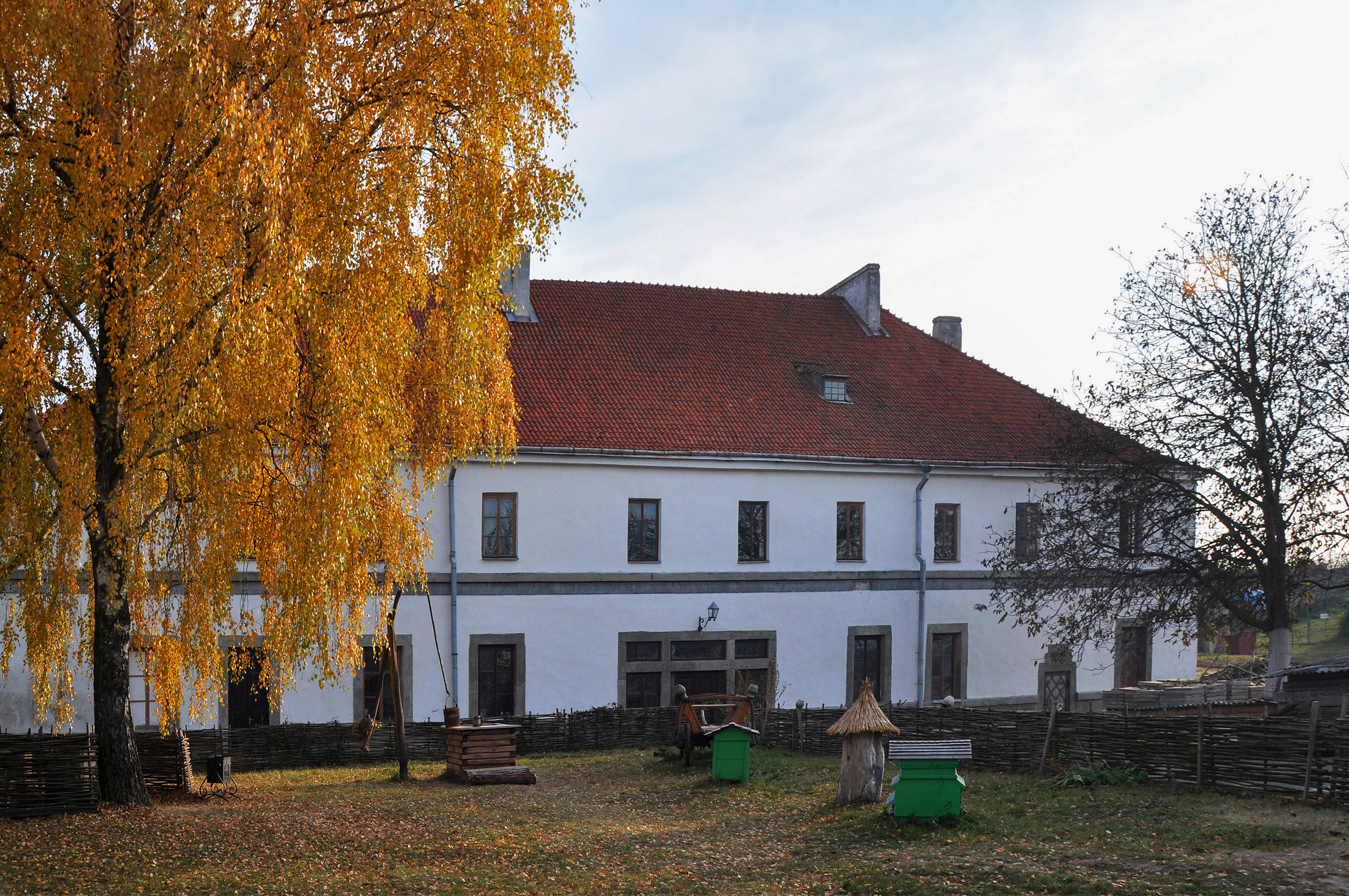
Ostrogski's palace at Dubno Castle

Ostrogski's huge latifundium, or landed estate in the eastern Polish–Lithuanian Commonwealth, consisted of 100 towns and 1300 villages. It was Ostrogski who built Starokostiantyniv Castle. His private army counted 15,000 soldiers from among the local boyars, land tenants, personal clients and allied Tatars. Ostroh boasted an Orthodox academy, a yeshiva, a mosque, and a Unitarian Church. By the end of the 16th century, Ostrogski's landholdings encompassed 80 towns and 2760 villages in Volhynia (today's Rivne, Khmelnytskyi and Ternopil regions), Kyiv and Bratslav voivodeships, Galicia and parts of modern Poland; 20 monasteries, 40 castles and 600 churches were located on those territories. The prince's annual income reached the sum of 19 million złoty, and he employed around 2,000 servants. As one of the richest magnates of Poland-Lithuania, Ostrogski was nicknamed "Uncrowned King of Ruthenia".

Ostrogski's Renaissance residence in Dubno Castle now functions as a museum and presents a number of artifacts left from the prince's times, including Orthodox icons and candlesticks. According to historical registries, the castle's original interior included opulent chandeliers, Turkish caprets, animal skins and feathers, glass and porcelain decorations, mirrors, many clocks, numerous silver and golden utensils and jewelry.

== Family ==
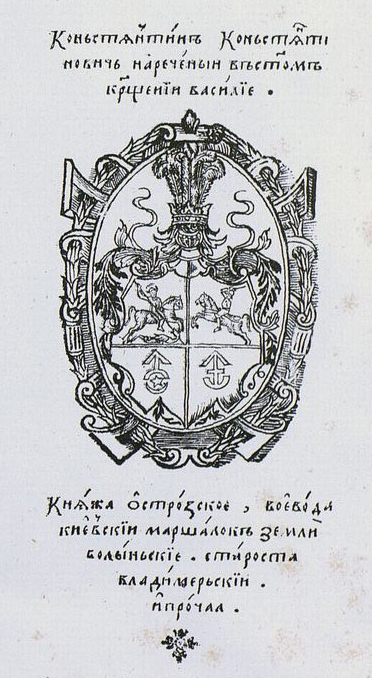
Konstanty Wasyl Ostrogski's personal coat of arms

In January 1553, Ostrogski married Zofia, the daughter of Crown hetman Jan Amor Tarnowski, in Tarnów. Zofia died in 1570 soon after the birth of their youngest son, Aleksander. Ostrogski was grieved by his wife's death and never married for a second time. The marriage produced five children:

- Janusz Ostrogski (1554–1620) – served as Volhynian voivode (1584-1593), castellan of Kraków (1593-1620) and starost of Bohuslav, Cherkasy, Korsun, Pereyaslav and Volodymyr; converted to Roman Catholicism in 1579, but supported the Orthodox clergy after the Union of Brest; founder of Ostroh ordination; last male representative of Ostrogski family.
- Konstanty Ostrogski "the Younger" (1555–1588) – married to Aleksandra Tyszkiewicz, in 1583 adopted Catholicism; served at the Lithuanian court, headed the starostwo of Volodymyr.
- Elżbieta Ostrogska (died 1599)
- Katarzyna Ostrogska (1560–1579)
- Aleksander Ostrogski (1570–1603) – in 1593 appointed voivode of Volhynia; supported the Orthodox Church and represented the anti-Union camp at Sejm gatherings; died unexpectedly in late 1603, buried in Ostroh; his marriage to Anna Kostka produced eight children:
  - Zofia Ostrogska – married to Kraków voivode Stanisław Lubomirski.
  - Anna Alojza Ostrogska
  - Katarzyna Ostrogska – in 1620 married Tomasz Zamoyski, voivode of Kyiv.
  - Konstanty Aleksander Ostrogski (died as a child)
  - Adam Konstanty Ostrogski (died as a child)
  - Krzysztof Ostrogski (died as a child)
  - Janusz Pawel Ostrogski (died as a child)
  - Wasyl Ostrogski (died as a child)

== Ancestry ==
Ancestors of Konstanty Wasyl Ostrogski

8. Vasily Fedorovich Ostrogski
4. Ivan Vasilyevich Ostrogski
9. Hanka Agafia Yamont
2. Konstanty Ostrogski
10. Ivan Vladimirovich Belsky
5. Maria Ivanovna Bielska
11. Vasilisa Olshanska
1.Konstanty Wasyl Ostrogski
12. Mikhailo Olelkovich
6. Simeon II Olelkovich
13. Anna
3. Aleksandra Olelkowicz-Słucka
14. Ivan Yurievich, Prince of Mstislavl
7. Princess Anastasia Slutskaya
15. Julianna

== Legacy ==
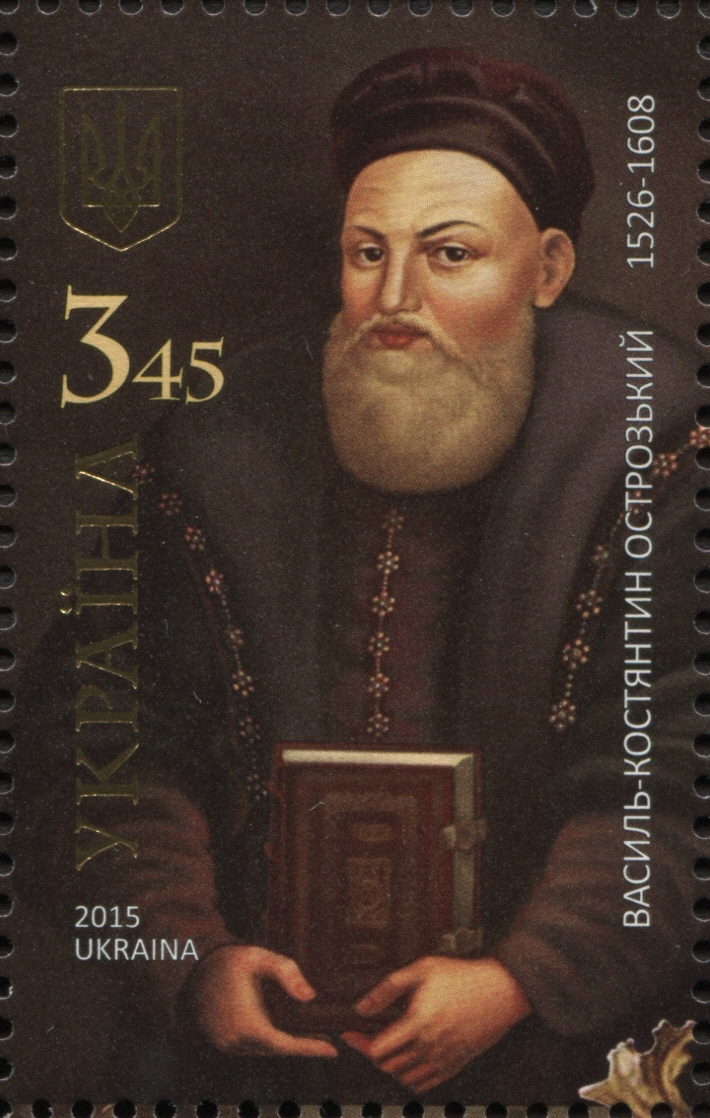
Ostrogski's portrait on a 2015 Ukrainian post stamp

=== Historical legacy ===
Ukrainian historian Mykhailo Hrushevsky characterized Ostrogski's activities as the "first national revival of Ukraine". His contribution was positively evaluated by Ivan Ohienko. The prince's legacy as seen as an important part of national identity in modern Ukraine. Since 2017 an exposition dedicated Ostrogski family has been functioning at the Kyiv Pechersk Lavra.

In the opinion of historian and Ukrainian Greek Catholic priest Ihor Isichenko, Ostrogski's legacy represents an example of oligarch influence on the Church. According to Isichenko, the prince's campaign against the Union of Brest was dictated by his fear of losing personal power over the faithful.

=== Canonization ===
A deeply religious person, Ostrogski entered the Orthodox tradition as an especially pious prince. He respected the Lent and regularly spent the first week of the period in seclusion at the Holy Cross Monastery near Dubno, dressed as a simple monk. Caring for the sick, he established a hospital in Ostroh. Ostrogski became known as the founder and restorer of numerous convents, and supported the St. Michael's, St. Cyril's and Pechersk monasteries in Kyiv. Supporting the unity of Christian Church, he at the same time opposed the Union of Brest due to its non-universal character. In 2008 Ostrogski was canonized by the Ukrainian Orthodox Church - Kyiv Patriarchate, one of predecessors to the Orthodox Church of Ukraine, as a Right-Believing prince, with his feast taking place on 26th (O.S. 13th) February.

== See also ==
- Ostrogski family
- Starokostiantyniv Castle

== Bibliography ==
- Magocsi, Paul Robert (1996). A History of Ukraine. Toronto: University of Toronto Press. ISBN 0-8020-0830-5.
- Yakovenko, Natalya (2006). An Outline History of Medieval and Early Modern Ukraine. Krytyka. ISBN 9667679829.
