= Ostrogski family =

Polish-Ruthenian noble family

Ostrogski
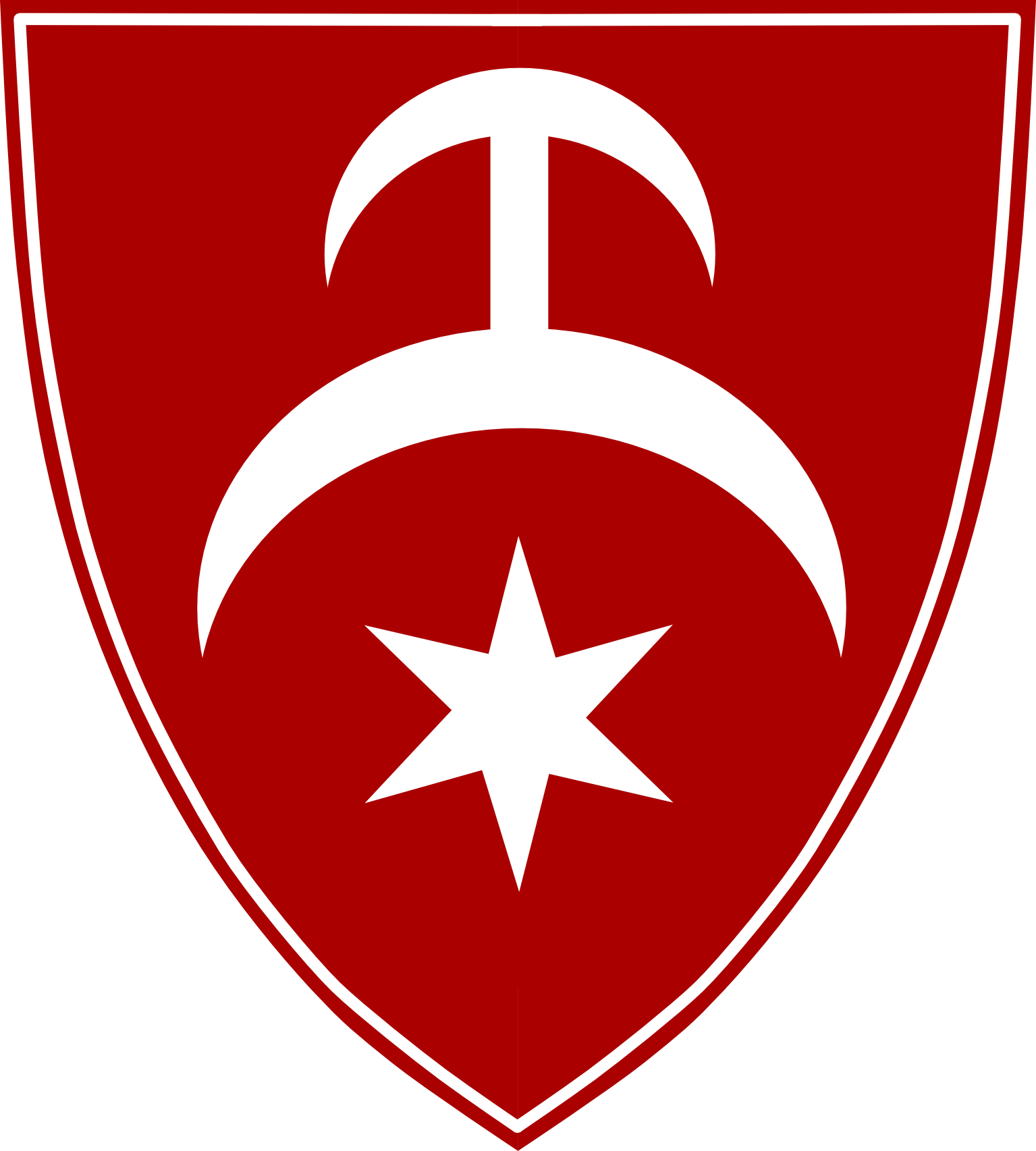
- Ostrogski (variation)
- Origin: Ostroh
- Members: Daniil Ostrogski; Feodor Ostrogski; Konstanty Ostrogski; Konstanty Wasyl Ostrogski; Halszka Ostrogska
- Connected families: Zasławski, Ostrozhetsky
- Estates: Ostroh Castle; Dubno Castle; Starozaslavsky Castle; Starokostiantyniv Castle; Stare Selo Castle; Ostrogski Palace

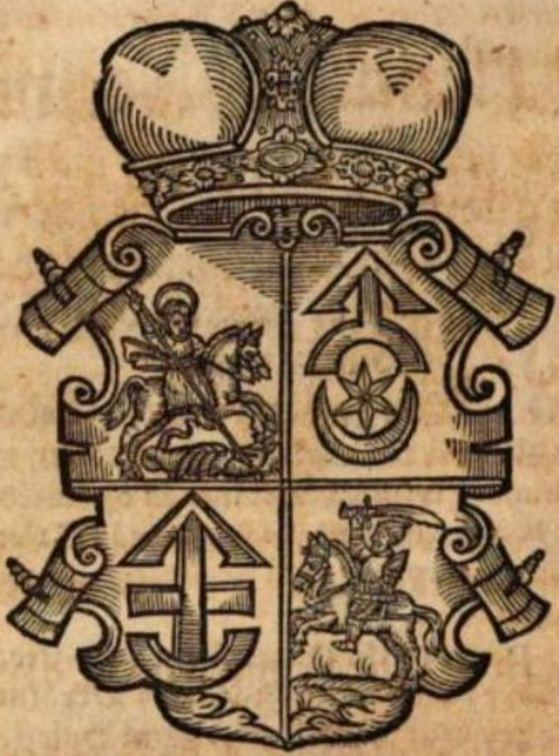
Ostrogski family coat of arms by Bartosz Paprocki

The House of Ostrogski (Polish: Ostrogscy; Lithuanian: Ostrogiškiai; Ukrainian: Острозькі, romanized: Ostroz'ki) was one of the more prominent families in the Kingdom of Poland, the Grand Duchy of Lithuania and in the Polish–Lithuanian Commonwealth. The family spanned from the 14th century Ruthenian noble Daniil Ostrogski to the 17th century Polish members. After the death of Janusz Ostrogski, the last male heir, most of the family's possessions passed to the Zasławski family.

The family played a crucial role in preserving the Eastern Orthodoxy, particularly during the Union of Brest signing in 1595. Members contributed to printing books in Church Slavonic (Kyivan Rus] recession) and supporting the Orthodox brotherhoods. By the 17th century almost all members turn to Catholicism and became fully associated with the Polish nation (Polonization). Many of their possessions were passed on or inherited by members of Sanguszko family.

== History ==
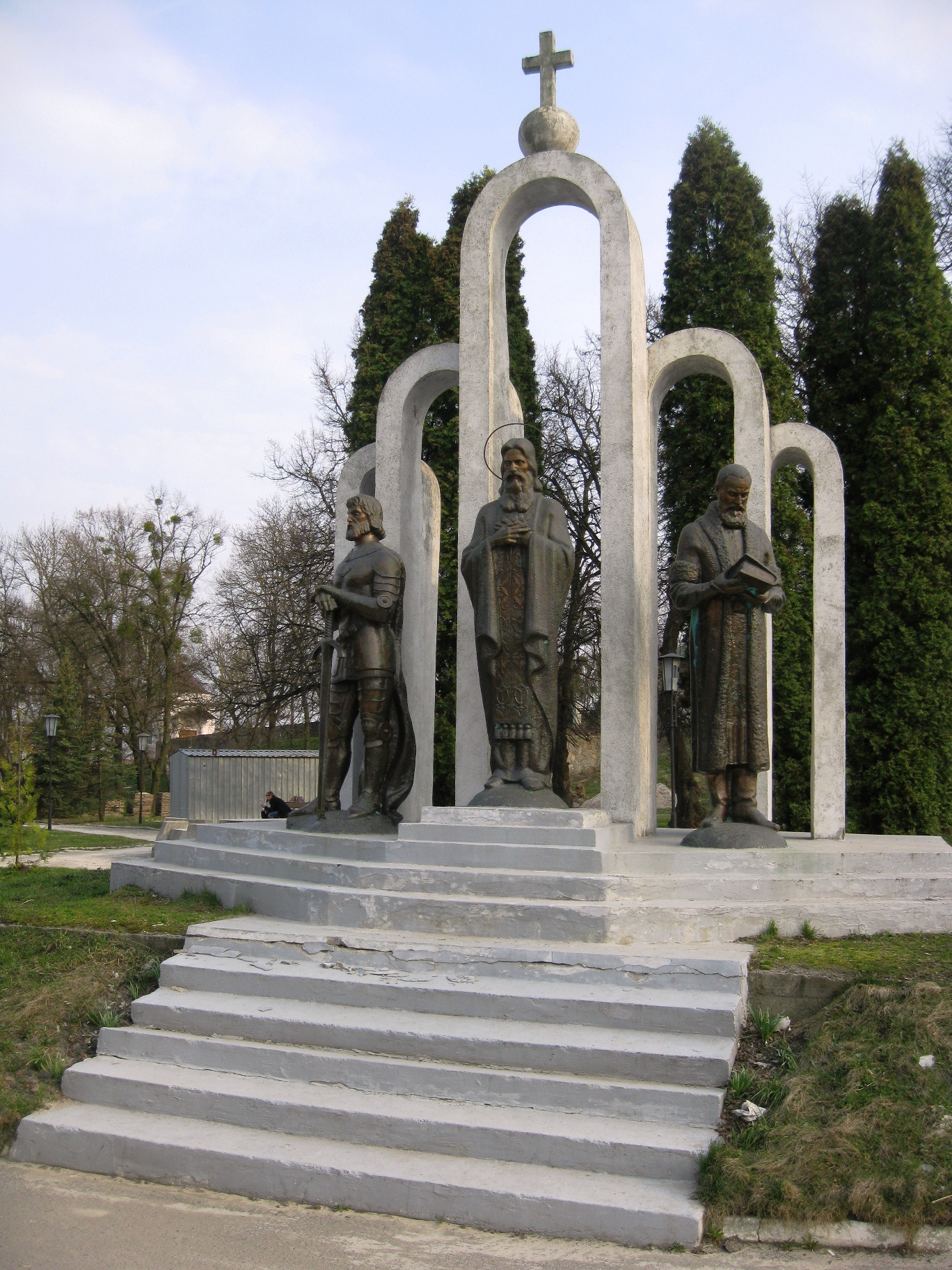
Monument to the princes in Ostroh: Konstanty Ostrogski, Feodor Ostrogski, Konstanty Wasyl Ostrogski

The Ostrogski family was most likely of Rurikid stock and descended from Sviatopolk II of Kiev. Some scholars however claim that their descent is from the Galicia-Volhynia line of the Rurikid dynasty. Vasilko Romanovich (c.1256-1282), Prince of Slonim, may have been the grandfather of Prince Danylo Ostrozky. The probable progenitor of this family was Prince Danylo Dmytrovych (or Danylo Wasilijewicz), who received Ostroh from Liubartas, son of Grand Duke of Lithuania Gediminas. His son, Prince Feodor Danilovich Ostrogski, was a supporter of King Jagiello, who in 1386 confirmed him in possession of the Ostroh Castle and appointed governor of Volhynia in 1387. In addition to Ostrog Feodor Danilovich Ostrogski became owner of Korets, Zaslav (Izyaslav, in present Khmelnytskyi Oblast, Ukraine), and other towns. In some chronicles Feodor is called Dux Fethko de Ostrog. Their dominions in Volynia, Galicia, and Podolia included 24 towns, 10 townlets, and more than 100 villages.

Possessions of Ostrogski are marked in pink

The most notable among Feodor's descendants was Grand Hetman of Lithuania, Prince Konstanty Ostrogski, who defeated Muscovy in the Battle of Orsha (1514) and his son Konstanty Wasyl Ostrogski (or Kostiantyn-Vasyl Ostrozkyi). Unlike other Ruthenian magnates, the Ostrogskis refused to give up Eastern Orthodoxy for Roman Catholicism despite the cultural pressure that led to Polonization of Ruthenian nobility. For several generations the Ostrogskis supported the religion of their forefathers, by opening schools, printing books in Ruthenian language with Cyrillic such as "Ostrog Bible" (written by Ivan Fedorov) and making a generous charitable contributions to the construction of the Orthodox churches in the region.

The last male member of the family was Janusz Ostrogski (d. 1620); the last female was Anna Alojza Ostrogska (1600–54), married to Grand Hetman Jan Karol Chodkiewicz. When a junior line of the family (princes Zasławski or Zasławski-Ostrogowski) which inherited the Ostrogoski fortune became extinct in 1682 (with the death of Aleksander Janusz Zasławski), their huge possessions passed to the Lubomirski family (due to their marriage with Aleksander sister, Teofilia Ludwika Zasławska) and other families of Polish szlachta. A complicated litigation concerning the Ostrogski inheritance continued until the Russian Empire annexed Poland during the Partitions.

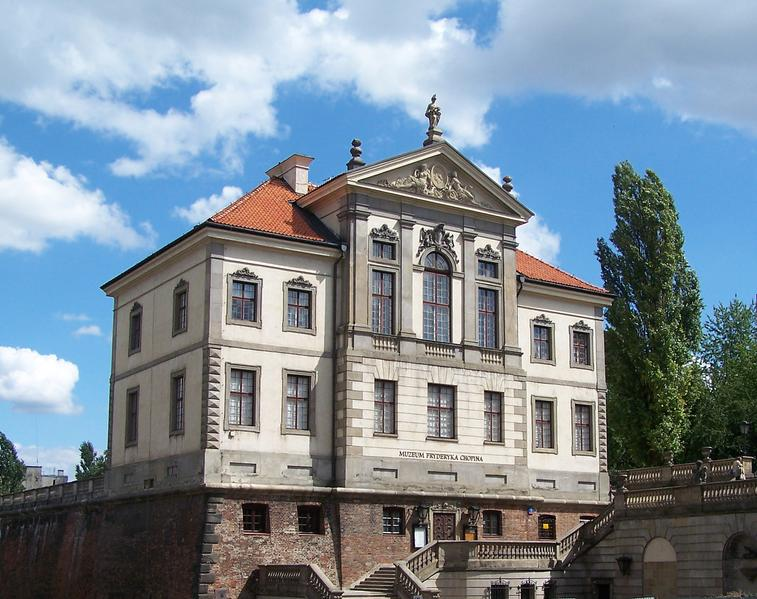
Ostrogski Palace in Warsaw, Poland

== Notable family members ==
- Daniil Ostrogski (? - after 1366), ancestor of the Ostrogski house.
- Feodor Ostrogski (1360–1446), governor of Volhynia.
- Konstanty Ostrogski (1460–1530) - Hetman of the Polish–Lithuanian Commonwealth.
- Ilia Ostrogski (1510–1539), Braclaw starost
- Elizaveta Ostrogska (1539–1582)
- Konstanty Wasyl Ostrogski (1526–1608), marshal of Volhynia and voivode of the Kiev Voivodeship.
- Janusz Ostrogski (1554–1620), Voivode of Volhynian Voivodship and castellan of Kraków.
- Aleksander Ostrogski (1571–1603), Voivode of the Volhynian Voivodship.
- Aleksander Janusz Zasławski-Ostrogski (c.1650 - 1682), Last of Dukes Ostrogski-Zasławski.
- Władysław Dominik Zasławski-Ostrogski (c.1616-1656), Voivode of Sandomierz Voivodship.
- Zofia Ostrogska (1595–1662), married Stanisław Lubomirski.
- Anna Alojza Ostrogska (1600–1654), married Jan Karol Chodkiewicz.
- Katarzyna Ostrogska (1602–1642), married Tomasz Zamoyski.
- Teofilia Ludwika Zasławska (1650–1709), married Dymitr Jerzy Wiśniowiecki, then Józef Karol Lubomirski
- Katarzyna Ostrogska (1560–1579), married Krzysztof Mikołaj "the Thunderbolt" Radziwiłł

=== Family tree ===
Daniel
George d. ~ 1377	Theodore; ~ 1410	Agatha	Michael d. 1399	Demetrius d. 1399	Anastasia	Alexander (Olexa) d. 1388
Theodor (Frederik)	Basileus the Red d. 1461	Hanka (Agatha)	Dashko d. 1420	Andrew (Andrushko) d. after 1436	Mytko d. 1442	Anastasia	Theodora-Anna
Vaclav (Frederik) d. 1460	John d. after 1465	Maria	George d. 1530	Agrippine
Tetiana	Constantine d. 1530	Alexandra	Michael d. 1501	Maria
Beata; 1510-1539	Elijah; 1510-1539	Constantine Basileus; 1526-1608	Sophia	Sophia-Mavra d. after 1561
Elizabeth (Halshka); 1539-1582	Alexander; 1570-1603	Anna; 1575-1635	Catherine; 1560-1579	Elizabeth d. 1599	Constantine d. 1588	Suzanna	Janusz; 1554-1620	Theophilia
Alexander d. 1607	Adam Constantine; 1597-1618	Christof d. 1606	Janusz Paul; 1598-1619	Anna Aloise; 1600-1654	Basileus d. 1605	Catherine; 1602-1642	Sophia; 1595-1622	Eleonora d. 1618	Euphrosina d. 1628	John-Volodymyr; 1617-1618

== See also ==
- Lithuanian nobility
- List of szlachta
