= Oleksander Ostrogski =

Polish–Lithuanian nobleman (1571–1603)

Aleksander Ostrogski
- Prince

- Coat of arms: Ostrogski
- Born: c. 1571; Wiewiórka
- Died: 1603; Tarnopol
- Family: Ostrogski
- Consort: Anna Kostka h. Dąbrowa
- Issue: Zofia Ostrogska; Konstanty Ostrogski; Janusz Ostrogski; Anna Alojza Ostrogska; Katarzyna Ostrogska
- Father: Konstanty Wasyl Ostrogski h. Ostrogski
- Mother: Zofia Tarnowska h. Leliwa

Prince Aleksander Ostrogski (Belarusian: Аляксандар Астрожскi; Ukrainian: Олександр Острозький; Lithuanian: Aleksandras Ostrogiškis; c. 1571 – 1603) was a nobleman of the Polish–Lithuanian Commonwealth.

Son of voivode of Troki and Hetman Prince Konstanty Wasyl Ostrogski and Zofia Tarnowska h. Leliwa, the daughter of voivode of Ruthenia and Kraków Hetman Jan Amor Tarnowski h. Leliwa and Zofia Szydłowiecka h. Odrowąż.

He was voivode of Wołyń since 1593 and starost of Pereiaslav. In 1592 he married Anna Kostka h. Dąbrowa a Roman Catholic.

Aleksander stay the only son of Konstanty Wasyl Ostrogski who remained Orthodox. Together with his father he acted against the Union of Brest. He founded the Monastery of Holy Trinity in the village of Mezhirich. Aleksander was buried in the Church of Lord's Theophany in Ostróg.

== Marriage and issue ==
Aleksander married in 1592 Anna Kostka h. Dąbrowa, the daughter of voivode of Sandomierz and podskarbi Jan Kostka h. Dąbrowa and Elżbieta Elenborg z Eilemberku and had five children:

- Zofia Ostrogska (1595–1622), married voivode of Ruthenia and Kraków Prince Stanisław Lubomirski h. Szreniawa, mother of Marshal and Hetman Jerzy Sebastian Lubomirski h. Szreniawa
- Konstanty Ostrogski (died 1618)
- Janusz Ostrogski (died 1619)
- Anna Alojza Ostrogska (1600–1654), married Hetman Jan Karol Chodkiewicz h. Kościesza
- Katarzyna Ostrogska (1602–1642), married voivode of Podole and Kijów (Kyiv, or Kiev) Chancellor Tomasz Zamoyski h. Jelita, grandmother of King of Poland Michał Korybut Wiśniowiecki

== Bibliography ==
- Polski Słownik Biograficzny t. 24 s.
- Barbara Sawczyk, Maria Sąsiadowicz, Ewa Stańczyk, Ocalić od zapomnienia... Patroni tarnowskich ulic. Tom 2, Tarnów 2004, ISBN 83-915445-6-7
