= Katarzyna Ostrogska (1602–1642) =

Polish–Lithuanian noblewoman

- Princess
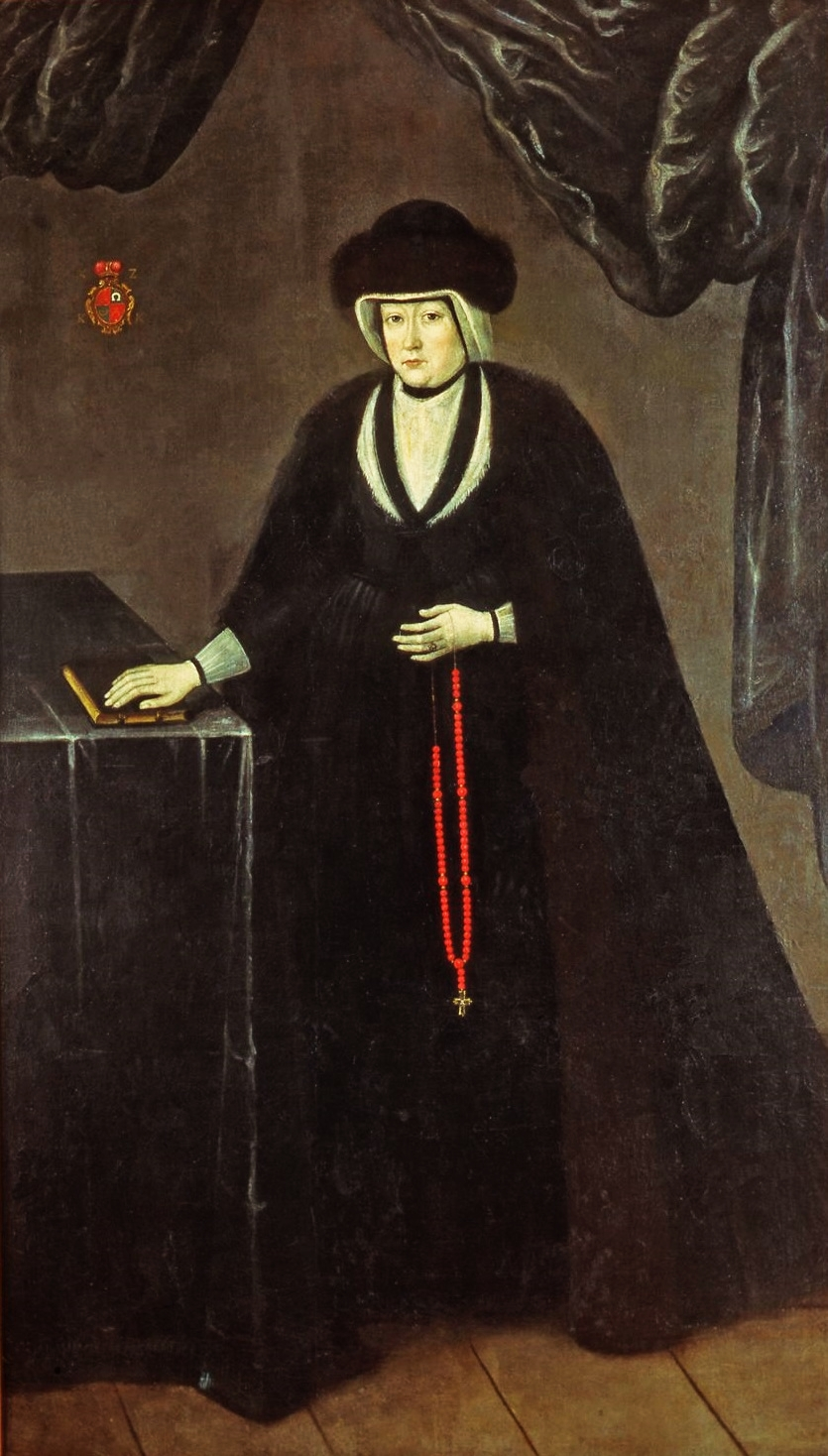
- Coat of arms: Ostrogski
- Born: 1602
- Died: 1642 (aged 39–40); Zamość (probably)
- Family: Ostrogski
- Consort: Tomasz Zamoyski h. Jelita
- Issue: Jan "Sobiepan" Zamoyski; Gryzelda Konstancja Zamoyska; Joanna Barbara Zamoyska
- Father: Aleksander Ostrogski h. Ostrogski
- Mother: Anna Kostka h. Dąbrowa

Katarzyna Ostrogska
- Coat of arms
- Noble family: Ostrogski

Princess Katarzyna Ostrogska (1602–1642) was a Polish–Lithuanian noblewoman, founder of the city of Biała (modern Janów Lubelski). She was the maternal grandmother of King of Poland Michał Korybut Wiśniowiecki.

== Life ==
She was the daughter of voivode of Wołyń Prince Oleksander Ostrogski h. Ostrozky, and Anna Kostka h. Dąbrowa. She married voivode of Podole and Kijów (Kyiv, also Kiev) Chancellor Tomasz Zamoyski h. Jelita. She became the mother of Jan "Sobiepan" Zamoyski (1627-1665), voivode of Kijów and Sandomierz (married Marie Casimire Louise de La Grange d'Arquien, the later consort to King John III Sobieski), Gryzelda Konstancja Zamoyska (1623-1672), mother of King Michał Korybut Wiśniowiecki, and Joanna Barbara Zamoyska (1626-1653).

Widowed in 1638, she took over the management of the Zamoyski Estate. 21 July 1640, the king granted her the privilege to found the city of Biała. She was also granted the right to organize the government of the city and appoint its officials. She wrote several documents regulating the life in her city.
