= Janusz Ostrogski =

Polish–Lithuanian noble (1554–1620)

- Prince
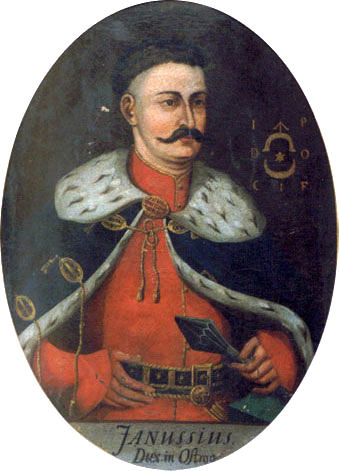

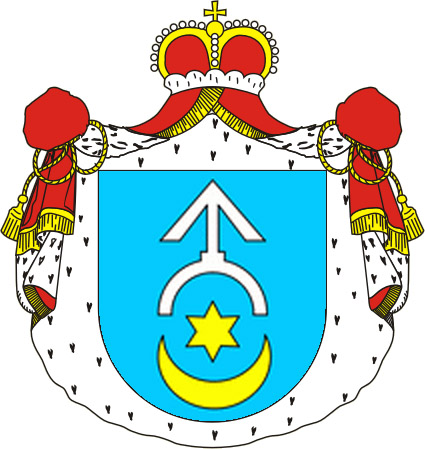
- Coat of arms: Ostrogski's coat of arms Ostrogski
- Born: 1554
- Died: 17 September 1620 (aged 65–66)
- Family: Ostrogski
- Consort: Zuzanna Seredi; Katarzyna Lubomirska; Teofilia Tarło
- Issue: with Zuzanna Seredi; Eleonora Ostrogska; Eufrozyna Ostrogska
- Father: Konstanty Wasyl Ostrogski
- Mother: Zofia Tarnowska

Prince Janusz Ostrogski (Lithuanian: Jonušas Ostrogiškis; 1554 – 17 September 1620 in Tarnów) was a Polish–Lithuanian noble and statesman. He served as a voivode of Volhynia (1584–1593), as a castellan of Kraków (from 1593 on), and as a starosta of Bohuslav (from 1591), Biała Cerkiew (since 1592), Czerkasy and Kaniów (from 1594), Perejasław (1604 on) and Włodzimierz.

Ostrogski was one of the richest magnates of the Commonwealth, and the last of the male line of his family. Upon his death his estate passed to the Zasławskis.

== Biography ==
Janusz was of the princely Ostrogski family, the son of Konstanty Wasyl Ostrogski and Sophie née Tarnowski. He had four siblings; brothers Aleksander and Konstanty and sisters Katarzyna and Elzbieta. He spent his early childhood in Dubno, and then lived at the court of Holy Roman Emperor in Vienna. In 1579 he converted from Orthodoxy to Roman Catholicism.

In 1577, he led the defense of Dubno against the Tatars. During the Livonian War in 1579, he participated in military campaigns in Chernigov and Novgorod-Seversky. On 2 February 1593 together with Alexander Vyshnevetsky he won the battle with the Cossack army under the command of Kosinski. For the protection of state borders and their own possessions in 1609, he founded Ostrogski ordination, the capital of which over time became Dubno.

He held several senior government positions; opposed the support of the Pretender Dmitri I, and the Commonwealth war with the Moscow State (1609-1618), strengthened Dubno Castle ramparts, built a deep moat and a suspension bridge in the city, founded the Bernardine church and church of St. John of Nepomuk. In addition, he funded churches in Mezhyrich and Astrovtsy. Orthodox clerics in his province did not interfere.

He cherished treasures of the ancestors, especially the prized gold medal with the image of his father, Prince Constantine-Basil, which he took with him on hikes as an amulet. This medal is now in the Hermitage.

Ostrogski married Suzanne Sered in 1582, and had two daughters, Eleanor and Euphrosyne. His marriage in 1597 with Catherine Lubomirski was childless. His final marriage in 1612 with Teafiliya Tarlo produced a son, Janusz Vladimir, who died in infancy, causing the Ostrogski family to die out with its final ruler in 1620.

== See also ==
- Ostrogski family

== Sources ==
- Grand Duchy of Lithuania: Encyclopedia. At 3 tons / ed. GP Pashkov et al. Volume 1: Obolensky - cadence. - Minsk: Belarusian Encyclopedia, 2005. - 684 sec.: Il. ISBN 985-11-0314-4.^{[ ISBN 9851103144 - did not match any book results]}
- Энцыклапедыя гісторыі Беларусі (Encyclopedia of the History of Belarus). At 6 m. T. 1: А-Беліца (А. Bjelica) / Belarus. Entsykl.; Editorial Board.: M. VA Beach, etc.; subject. M. Tkachev; Mast. EE Zhakevich. — Mn.: BelEn, 1993. — 494 [8] k.: il. ISBN 5-85700-074-2.
- Barbara Sawczyk, Maria Sąsiadowicz, Ewa Stańczyk. Ocalić od zapomnienia... Patroni tarnowskich ulic. Tom 2. Tom second — Tarnów, 2004. ISBN 83-915445-6-7.^{[ ISBN 8391544567 - did not match any book results]}
