= Feodor Ostrogski =

- Prince
- Coat of arms: Ostrogski
- Born: 1360
- Died: 1446 (aged 85–86); Kyiv Pechersk Lavra
- Family: Ostrogski
- Consort: Agata Czurylowna (Agrafena ?)
- Issue: Wasyl "Krasny" Ostrogski
- Father: Danylo Ostrozky
- Mother: Wassilisa(?)

Prince Feodor Ostrogski (1360–1446) was a magnate in Volhynia of Rurikid stock, son of Danylo Ostrozky. In some sources he is called Teodor, Fedko or Frederic. He was active in the Hussite Wars and assisted Sigismund Korybut.

== Biography ==
In 1386 Grand Duke of Lithuania Władysław II Jagiełło granted him possession of Ostroh castle and appointed him governor of Volhynia with the capital at Lutsk in 1387. In addition to Ostrog, Feodor became owner of Korets, Iziaslav (Zaslav), and other towns.

On 4 September 1390, Knyaz Feodor commanded the defence of one of the Vilnius Castles during its siege by the Vytautas, Teutonic Knight and knight guests from almost all of European states during the Lithuanian Civil War (1389–1392). The Crooked Castle was captured and its commander, Karigaila, brother of Jogaila, was killed. The Upper castle, with Polish staff and lower, commanded by Feodor, were rescued.

According to the research of Leontii Voitovych, Ulrich von Richental’s chronicle of the Council of Constance mentions an unnamed “high-born prince of Red Ruthenia” as a member of Metropolitan Gregory Tsamblak’s delegation in 1418. Voitovych argues that this unnamed nobleman was Feodor Ostrogski, whom he identifies as a possible cadet-line descendant of the Romanovichi dynasty and a claimant to the Galician–Volhynian heritage.

In 1422 Feodor travelled to Bohemia in the entourage of Sigismund Korybut and was sent by him as an ambassador to the Hussites. He fought in the Battle of Aussig. A folk song about this battle mentions Frederic, Ruthenian Prince of Ostrog, who left home and had assimilated Czech habits and language (Jan Długosz book XI, page 650). In 1430 with Sigismund Korybut and Hussites he captured Gliwice and they made this town their stronghold, their participation in the Hussite assault on Saxony is however doubtful. Długosz, however, mentions it. At Easter of the same year a group under the command of Frederic Prince of Ostrog, Jakub Nadobny from Rogów and Jan Kuropatwa from Łańcuchów Średniawa, attacked Jasna Góra Monastery, plundered it and destroyed Icon of Black Madonna of Częstochowa. A year later with Sigismund Korybut he attacked the Hungarian monastery in Lechnica.

In the 1430s he supported Grand Duke Švitrigaila and the Teutonic Order in the civil war against Sigismund Kęstutaitis and war against Poland. On 30 November 1432 he was defeated at Kopestrzyn (or kopersztyn) by Ruthenian voivode Wincenty z Szamotuł, Feodor escaped.

In 1433 he led Czech and Polish Hussites from Greater Poland in battles against Poland and Neumark, they captured Drawno, Dobiegniew, Złocieniec and Santok; Gorzów Wielkopolski was rescued. Then they were joined by Hussites from Lesser Poland and after an unsuccessful siege of Chojnice castle captured Tczew, took two thousand captives and besieged Gdańsk with no result. After he captured Jasieniec on 13 September, a three-month armistice was agreed. On expiry of the truce, Ostrogski burned and looted Brest-Litovsk. Castle was not captured, however, due to Masovian Dukes relief. At that time he was probably imprisoned with Teodor Korybut by their own suzerain, Švitrigaila, and then rescued by Michał Buczacki. It is not certain if Feodor Ostrogski switched sides and because of it was imprisoned, or if it happened after he was recaptured.

He died as a monk and was buried at the Kyiv Pechersk Lavra under the name Teodosii (Theodosius) and was later canonized (his feast day is 24 August).

== See also ==
- House of Ostrogski
- Lithuanian nobility
- List of szlachta
