= Konstantin Ostrozhsky =

Konstantin Ostrozhsky may refer to:

- Konstanty Ostrogski (c. 1460-1530), Lithuanian nobleman and military leader
- Konstanty Wasyl Ostrogski (1526–1608), Lithuanian nobleman
