= Kostka family =

Polish noble family

Dąbrowa Coat of Arms

The Kostka family (Kostkowie) was an old Polish noble family (szlachta) originated from Kashubia.

== Members ==
- Anna Kostka
- Jan Kostka
- Katarzyna Kostka
- Stanisław Kostka (1550–1568)

== Coat of arms ==
The Kostka family used the "Dąbrowa" arms.

Coat of arms Dąbrowa

Coat of arms of Kostka-Gostomski, 1818 (Gostomski III)

Coat of arms of the Kostka family used in Royal Prussia
