= Katarzyna Ostrogska (1560–1579) =

Ruthenian noblewoman (1560–1579)

- Princess
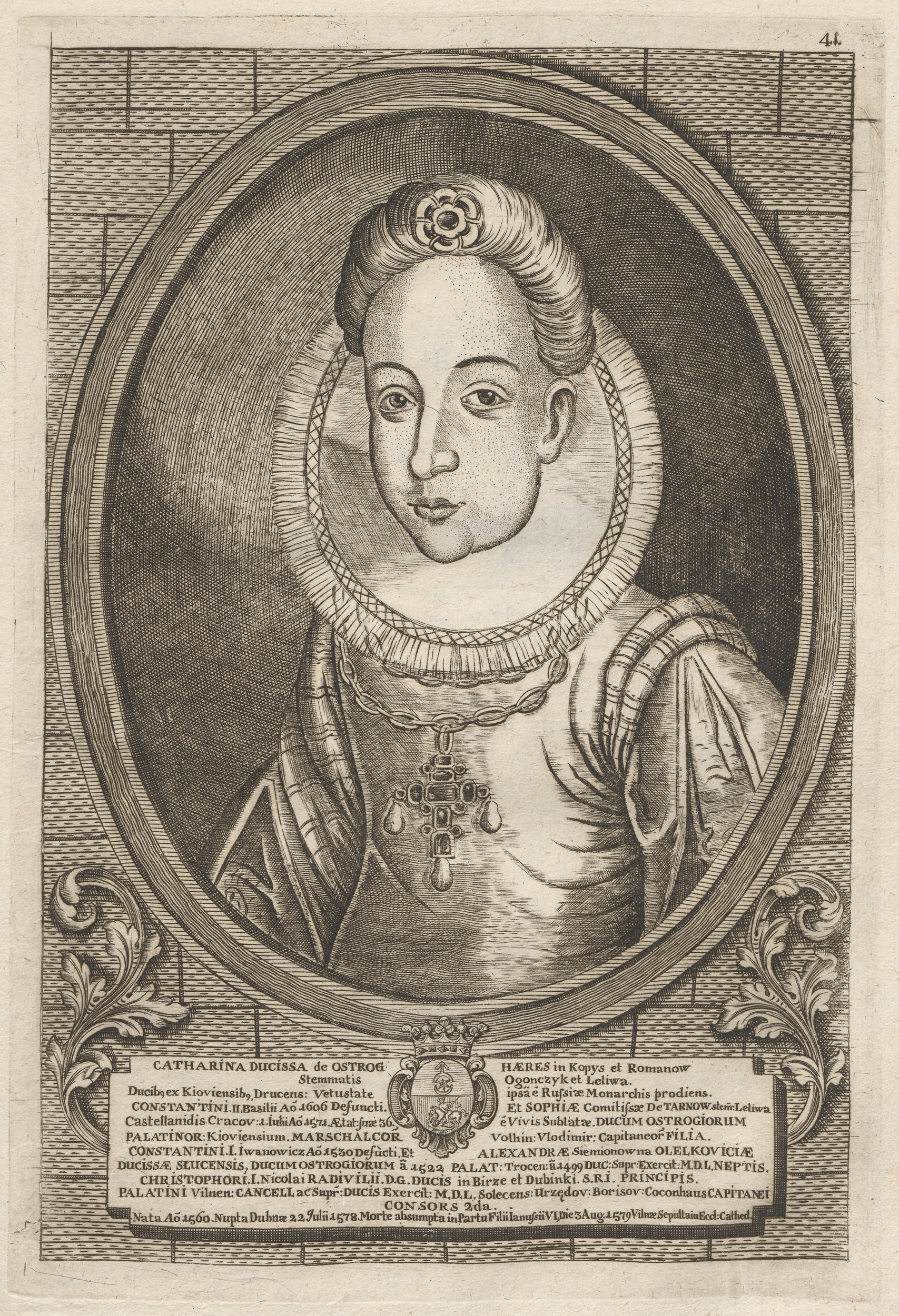

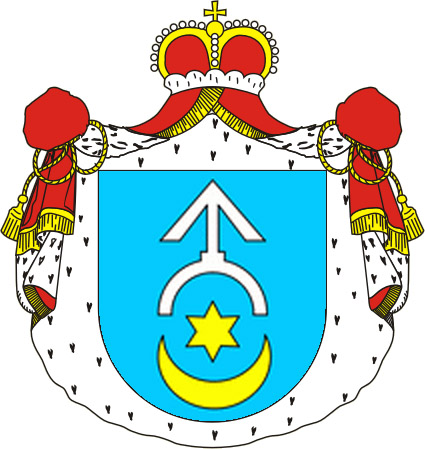
- Coat of arms: Ostrogski's coat of arms Ostrogski
- Born: 1560
- Died: 3 August 1579; Vilnius
- Family: Ostrozky
- Consort: Krzysztof Mikołaj Radziwiłł
- Issue: Janusz Radziwiłł
- Father: Konstanty Wasyl Ostrogski
- Mother: Zofia Tarnowska

Katarzyna Ostrogska
- Coat of arms
- Noble family: Ostrogski

Princess Katarzyna Ostrogska (Ukrainian: Катерина Острозька, Lithuanian: Kotryna Ostrogiškaitė) (1560–1579) was a Ruthenian noblewoman. She is renowned for the 1577 Siege of Dubno, during which nomads laid siege to the city with the intention of capturing her.

She was the second of four wives of Krzysztof Mikołaj Radziwiłł, whom she married on 22 July 1578 in Dubno.

== See also ==
- House of Ostrogski
- List of szlachta
