= Jan Zamoyski (1627–1665) =

Polish noble

Jan "Sobiepan" Zamoyski
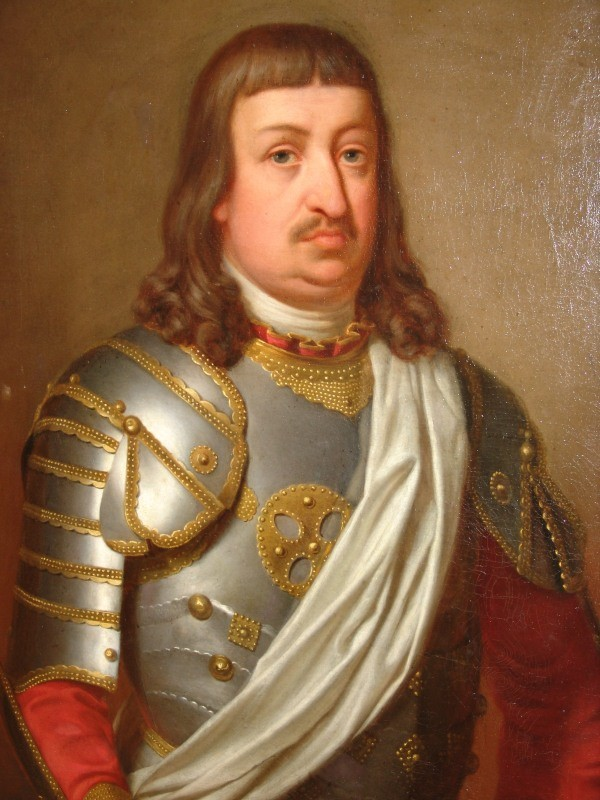
- Coat of arms: Jelita
- Born: 1627; Zamość
- Died: 7 April 1665 (age 37–38); Zamość
- Family: Zamoyski
- Consort: Marie Casimire Louise
- Issue: Ludwika Maria Zamoyska; Katarzyna Zamoyska
- Father: Tomasz Zamoyski
- Mother: Katarzyna Ostrogska

Jan "Sobiepan" Zamoyski (1627–1665) was a Polish nobleman (szlachcic) and magnate.

Jan was the 3rd Ordynat of the Zamość Ordynacja estates. He was General of Podolia from 1637, Krajczy of the Crown from 1653, Podczaszy of the Crown from 1655, voivode of Kijów Voivodeship (Kyiv, also Kiev) from 1658, voivode of Sandomierz Voivodeship from 1659, starost of Kałusz and Rostoki.

He married Marie Casimire Louise de la Grange d'Arquien on 3 March 1658 in Warsaw. In spite of their loveless marriage, they had four children, all of whom died in early childhood:

- Ludwika Maria (April 1659 – May 1659).
- Son (born and died January 1660).
- Katarzyna Barbara (5 December 1660 – December 1662).
- Daughter (May 1664 – August 1664).

Jan died on 2 April 1665, and his widow married her lover Jan Sobieski just over three months later, on 14 July of the same year. As Zamoyski had no surviving children, Ordynat of the Zamość Ordynacja estates eventually passed to his distant relative Marcin Zamoyski, who came from a younger branch of the family.
