= Zofia Tarnowska =

Polish–Lithuanian noblewoman (1534–1570)

- Countess
- Coat of arms: Leliwa
- Born: c. 1534
- Died: 1 July 1570; Wiewiórka, Poland
- Family: Tarnowski
- Consort: Konstanty Wasyl Ostrogski
- Issue: Elżbieta Ostrogska; Janusz Ostrogski; Katarzyna Ostrogska; Konstanty Ostrogski; Aleksander Ostrogski
- Father: Jan Tarnowski Leliwa
- Mother: Zofia Szydłowiecka h. Odrowąż

Countess Zofia Tarnowska (1534–1570) was a Polish noblewoman and heiress.

She was the daughter of Hetman Jan Amor Tarnowski h. Leliwa and Zofia Szydłowiecka h. Odrowąż.

== Marriage and issue ==
Zofia married Prince Konstanty Wasyl Ostrogski and had five children:

- Elżbieta Ostrogska (died 1599), married voivode of Brześć Litewski Jan Janusz Kiszka h. Dąbrowa and later Krzysztof Mikołaj "Piorun" Radziwiłł h. Trąby in 1593
- Janusz Ostrogski (1554–1620), was married to Zuzanna Seredi, Katarzyna Lubomirska and Teofilia Tarło
- Katarzyna Ostrogska (1560–1579), married Krzysztof Mikołaj "Piorun" Radziwiłł h. Trąby in 1578
- Konstanty Ostrogski (died 1588), married Aleksandra Tyszkiewicz h. Leliwa
- Aleksander Ostrogski (1571–1603), married Anna Kostka h. Dąbrowa

== See also ==
- Ternopil

== Bibliography ==
- Podhorodecki Leszek, Sławni hetmani Rzeczypospolitej, Warszawa 1994, s. 43, 65–66, 73.
