= Gryzelda Konstancja Wiśniowiecka =

Polish noblewoman (1623–1672)

Gryzelda Konstancja Zamoyska
- Princess
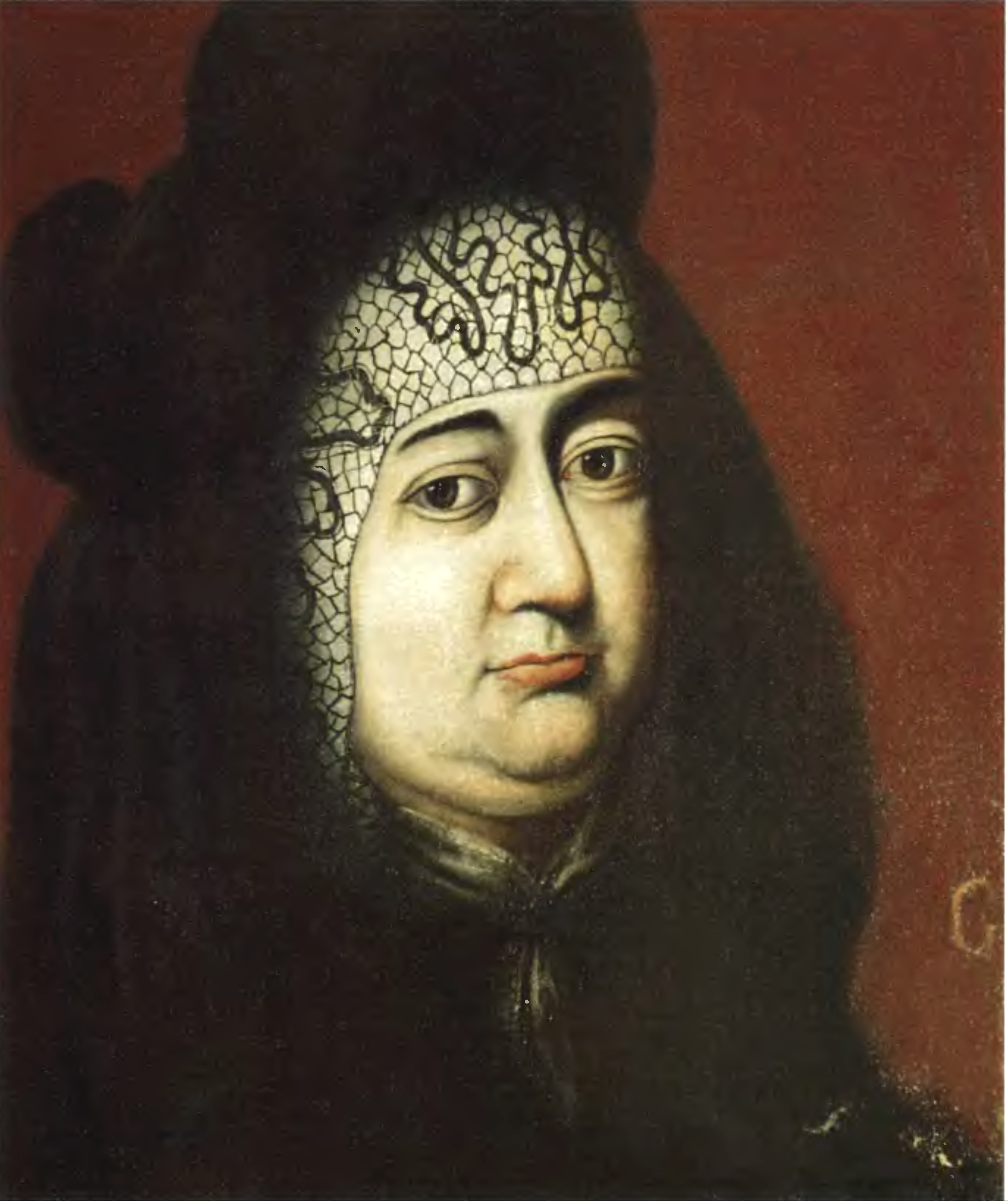
- Portrait, 1670s
- Coat of arms: Jelita
- Full name: Gryzelda Konstancja z Zamoyskich ks. Wiśniowiecka h. Jelita
- Born: 27 April 1623; Zamość, Poland
- Died: 17 April 1672 (aged 48); Zamość, Poland
- Family: Zamoyski
- Husband: Jeremi Michał Wiśniowiecki h. Korybut
- Issue: Michał Wiśniowiecki
- Father: Tomasz Zamoyski h. Jelita
- Mother: Katarzyna Ostrogska

Princess Gryzelda Konstancja Wiśniowiecka (née Zamoyska of clan Jelita; 27 April 1623 – 17 April 1672) was a Polish noblewoman, known as the mother of King Michał Korybut Wiśniowiecki.

== Life ==
She was the daughter of Tomasz Zamoyski, voivode of Podole and Chancellor and Princess Katarzyna Ostrogska. Gryzelda married Prince Jeremi Michał Wiśniowiecki h. Korybut on 27 February 1639 in Zamość and had one son, Michał Korybut Wiśniowiecki, King of Poland.

She became involved in a lengthy legal dispute with Marie Casimire Sobieska. She became involved in domestic politics after her son was elected to the throne, although over time her relationship with him soured. She contributed to her son's marriage to Eleanor of Habsburg, attempting to strengthen his weak authority and striving for an agreement with his political opponents. She probably arranged the marriage of Dymitr Wiśniowiecki with Sobieski's niece, but she failed to bring about a real agreement; over time, she began to lose influence over her son, who reportedly even avoided her company. She died in Zamość on April 17, 1672. According to the wish expressed in her will, she wanted to be buried in the Zamość church, but she was buried in St. John's Cathedral in Warsaw.

== Bibliography ==
- Ilona Czamańska: Wiśniowieccy - monografia rodu. Poznań: Wydawnictwo Poznańskie, 2007; ISBN 978-83-7177-229-0
