= Zofia Ostrogska =

Polish–Lithuanian noblewoman (1595–1622)

- Princess
- Ostrogski coat of arms.
- Born: 1595
- Died: 1622 (aged 26–27)
- Family: Ostrogski
- Consort: Stanisław Lubomirski
- Issue: Aleksander Michał Lubomirski; Jerzy Sebastian Lubomirski; Konstanty Jacek Lubomirski; Konstancja Lubomirska; Anna Krystyna Lubomirska
- Father: Oleksander Ostrogski
- Mother: Anna Kostka

Princess Zofia Ostrogska (Lithuanian: Zofija Ostrogiškaitė; 1595–1622) was a Polish–Lithuanian noblewoman of Ruthenian origin, known as the heiress of one of the greatest fortunes in Poland. She was the wealthiest woman in Poland.

She married Stanisław Lubomirski in 1613. Through this marriage he became an owner of 18 towns, 313 villages and 163 granges in the provinces of Kraków, Sandomierz, Ruthenia and Volhynia.
