= Ostroh Castle =

14th century castle in Ostroh, Ukraine

- Острозький замок
- Ostroh in Ukraine
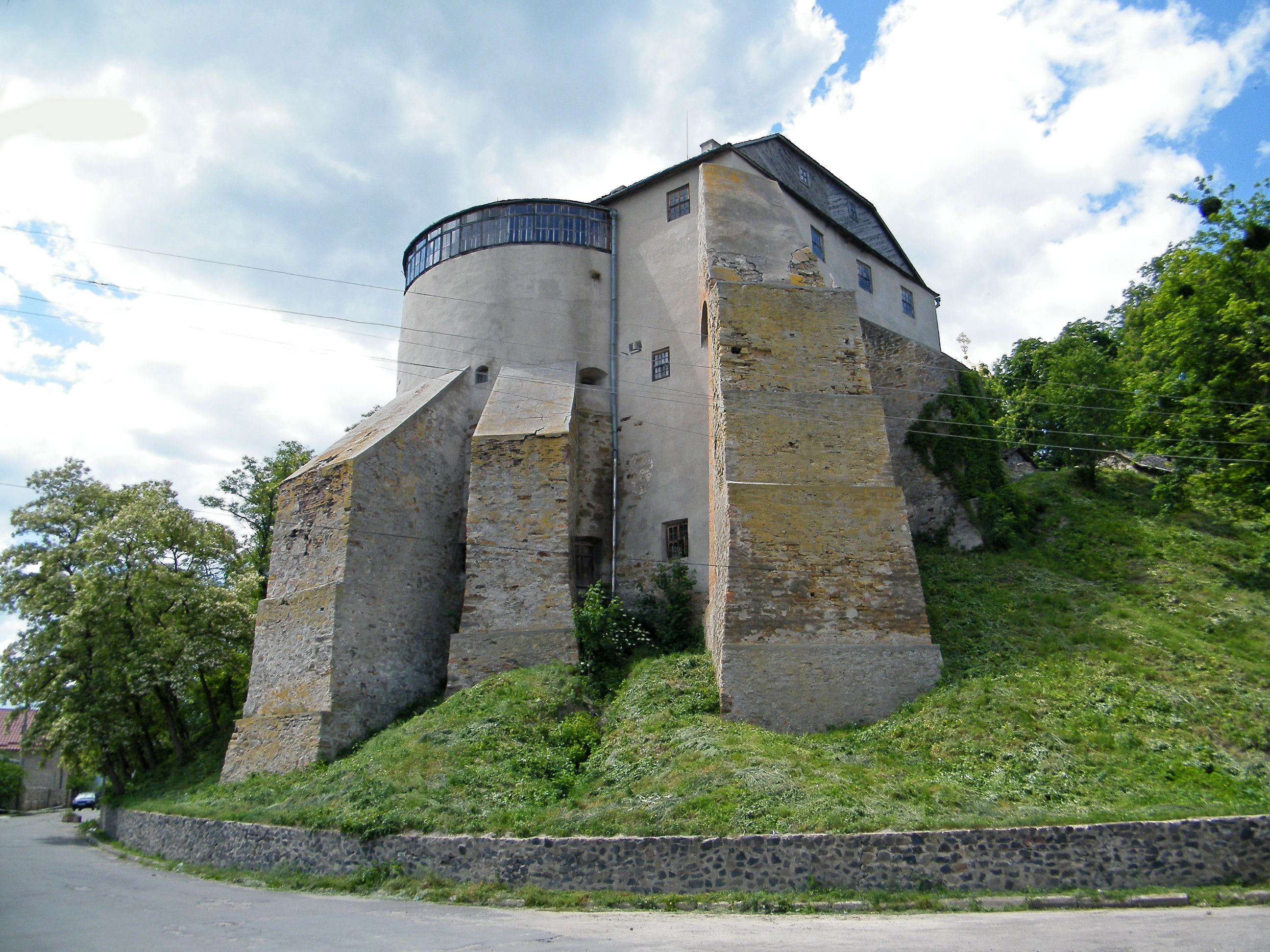

Site information
- Condition: Ruined
- Website: ostrohcastle.com.ua

Location
- Location within Ukraine
- Coordinates: 50°19′35″N 26°31′15″E

Immovable Monument of National Significance of Ukraine
- Official name: Замок (сторожова башта) (Castle (Guard Tower))
- Type: Architecture
- Reference no.: 170038/1

The Ostroh Castle (Ukrainian: Острозький замок, romanized: Ostroz'kyi zamok; Polish: Zamek w Ostrogu) is a castle in the city of Ostroh, located in the Rivne Oblast of western Ukraine. In the 14th, 15th and 16th centuries, the castle was the key stronghold of the powerful House of Ostroh. Today it is in ruins.

== Location ==
Ostroh Castle is a castle in the town of Ostroh, located in the Rivne Oblast, in western Ukraine.

The castle complex consists of four main structures: the Guard Tower (Vezha murovana) where the Ostroh Local History Museum is located, the Bohoiavlenska Church, the New Tower, and the Belltower, constructed in 1905. The castle is located in a relatively small elevated oval plaza. The area's natural geography helped to fortify the complex; the southern and eastern sides of the fortress raised upon a 20 metres (66 ft) high cliff, and the northern and western sides separate the city by series of moats that replaced the big ravine.

== History ==
The first wooden fortifications were built in the area before the 1241 Mongol invasion of Rus, during which they were subsequently destroyed.

During the 14th, 15th and 16th centuries, the castle was the key stronghold of the powerful House of Ostroh. From 1386, the town of Ostroh belonged to the Ostrogski family, who built the castle. Under the Ostrogski, the town grew in importance.

The ruins were later reconstructed by the founder of the family, Danylo Ostrozki, on the city's Sudovyi Hill. Since then, more additions and reconstructions have carried out, although the complex retains its medieval architecture.

In the early 20th century the castle was restored at the initiative of Ostroh priest Mykhailo Tuchemsky, the leader of the local branch of the Union of the Russian People. During that time a historical museum was opened on the site, and in 1909-1916 an Orthodox brotherhood named after Princes of Ostroh was active under Tuchemsky's leadership.

Both towers were built in the second half of the fifteenth and early sixteenth centuries from sandstone. They are three-tiered structures, with a plan that combines an oval with a rectangle. Since 1985, the Lutsk Tower has housed a book museum. The Tatar Tower is worse preserved, with a significant portion of the elliptical part of the building lost.

== Legacy ==
The castle is a ruin. A small park sits right next to the castle, separated by a small moat. A monument was placed in the park in 1978, commemorating the 400 anniversary of the foundation of the Ostroh Academy. A building used to stand in the same location, in which the "Azbuka" (alphabet) and the Ostrog Bible were printed by Ivan Fedorov.

In 2007, the castle was awarded a "Significant Landmark of Spiritual Ukraine", as part of competition to find the Seven Wonders of Ukraine.
