= Starokostiantyniv Castle =

16th century castle in Starokostiantyniv, Ukraine

Coordinates: 49°45′29″N 27°13′38″E

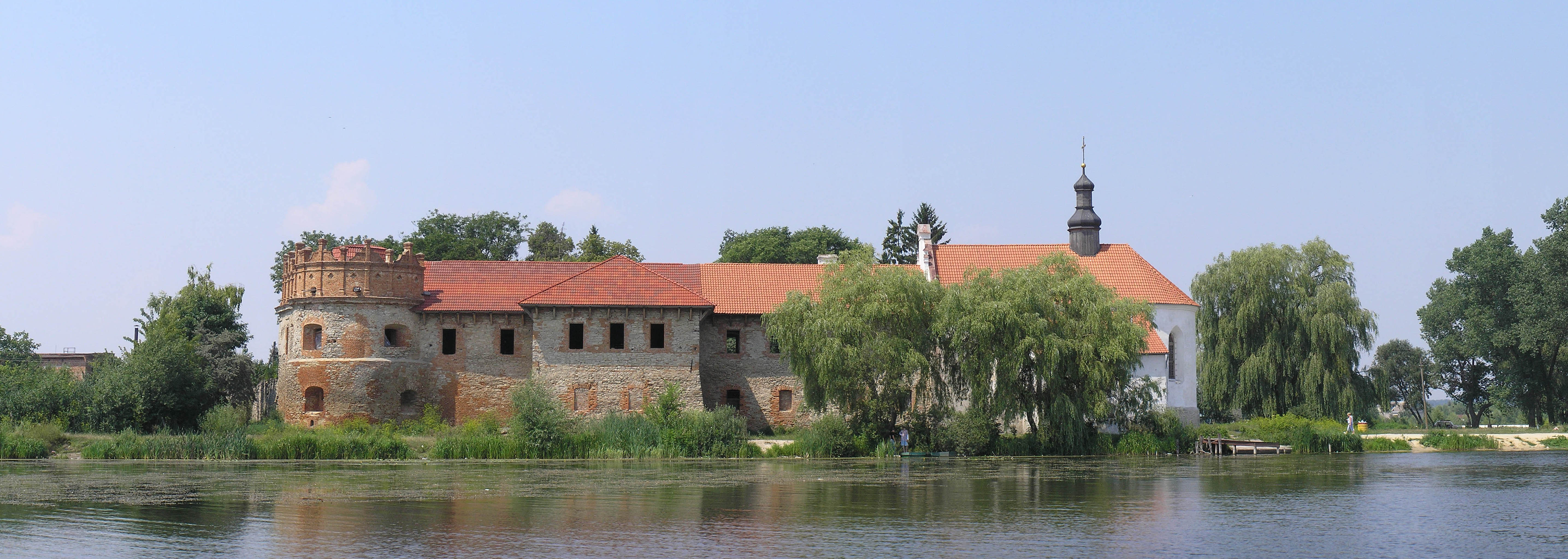
- View from across the Sluch River

Site history
- Built: 1560s

Immovable Monument of National Significance of Ukraine
- Official name: Комплекс будівель та споруд замку (Complex of buildings and structures of the castle)
- Type: Architecture
- Reference no.: 220046

The Starokostiantyniv Castle is a Volhynian castle built at the confluence of the Sluch and Ikopot' rivers by Prince Konstanty Wasyl Ostrogski in the 1560s.

The castle of Starokostiantyniv withstood many attacks by the Turks and the Crimean Tatars but was successfully stormed by the rebellious Cossacks in 1648. The castle played an important part in Ukraine's struggle for independence when Starokostiantyniv was visited by such national leaders as Bohdan Khmelnytsky and Petro Doroshenko.

The grounds still contain a fortified residence and a small church. The latter is dedicated to the Holy Trinity and has a single apse. A sacristy building adjoins it from the side of the river. The wall had five towers of which little remains. It used to be encircled by 6-metre-high earthen ramparts and a moat traversed by a drawbridge.

== Sources ==
- (in Russian) Памятники градостроительства и архитектуры Украинской ССР. — Киев: Будивельник, 1983—1986. — Том 4. — C. 225-6.
