= Tomasz Zamoyski =

Polish–Lithuanian nobleman (1594–1638)

- Szlachta and Magnate; 2nd Ordynat of the Zamość estates
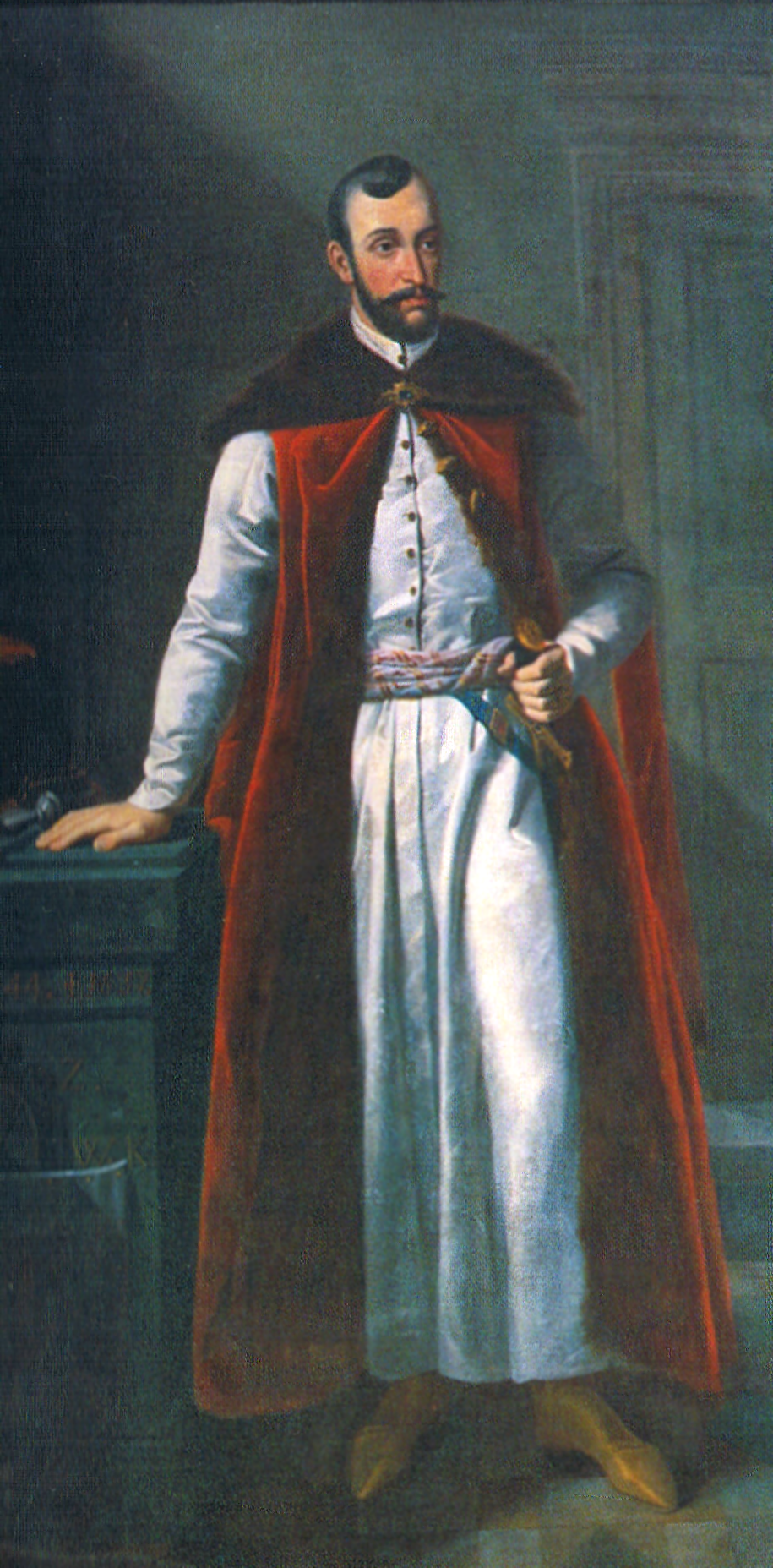
- Coat of arms: Jelita
- Born: 1594
- Died: January 1638 (aged 43–44)
- Family: Zamoyski
- Spouse: Katarzyna Ostrogska
- Issue: Jan "Sobiepan" Zamoyski; Gryzelda Konstancja Zamoyska; Joanna Barbara Zamoyska
- Father: Jan Zamoyski
- Mother: Barbara Tarnowska

Tomasz Zamoyski (1594 – 7 January 1638) was a Polish–Lithuanian nobleman (szlachcic) and magnate.

== Life ==
He travelled to London in July 1615 and was invited to hunt with King James at Theobalds. The master of ceremonies at the English court Lewis Lewknor hired two coaches with four horses each to bring Zamoyski to audiences with the King, Anne of Denmark, and Prince Charles.

Tomasz was the 2nd Ordynat of the Zamość estates. He was voivode of Podole Voivodeship in 1618, voivode of Kijów Voivodeship (Kyiv, also Kiev) in 1619, starost of Kraków in 1628, Deputy Chancellor of the Crown in 1635, as well as starost of Knyszyn, Sokal, Nowy Targ, Rabsztyn, Kałusz, Goniądz and Rzeczyce. The town of Tomaszów was named after him.

He married Katarzyna Ostrogska in 1620 and had three children with her.

Jelita coat of arms

Ostrogski coat of arms
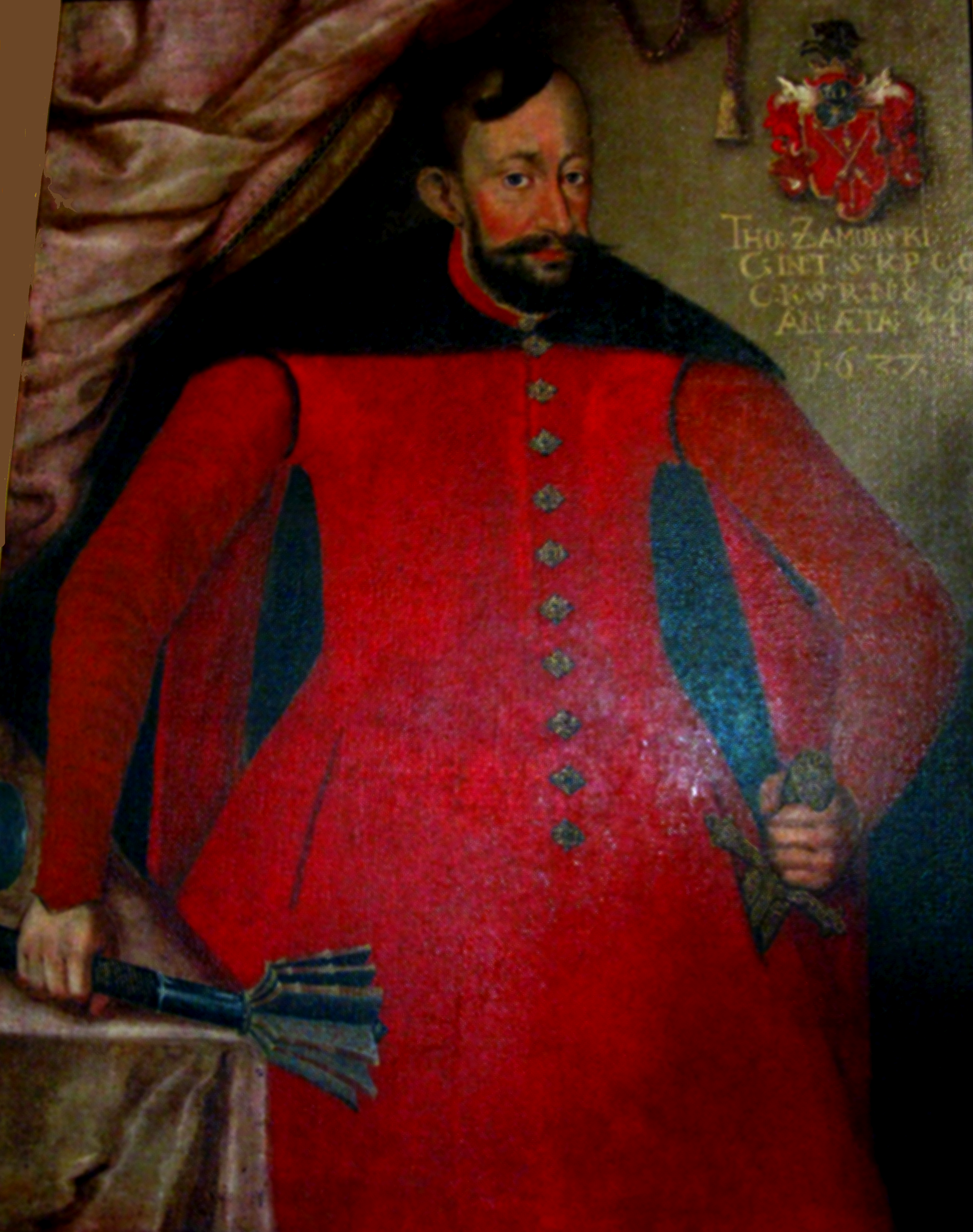
Tomasz Zamoyski [1637]

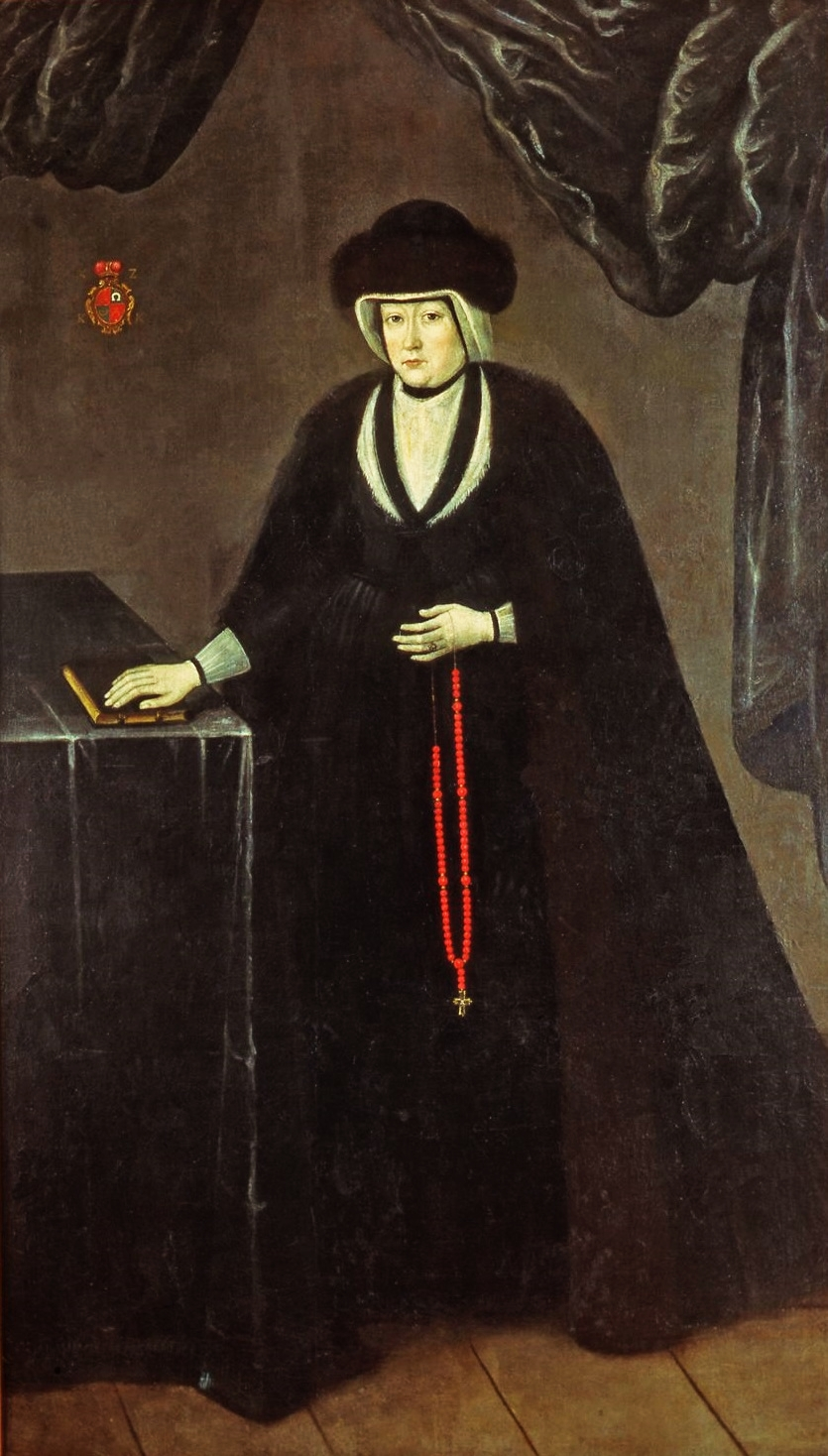
Katarzyna Ostrogska
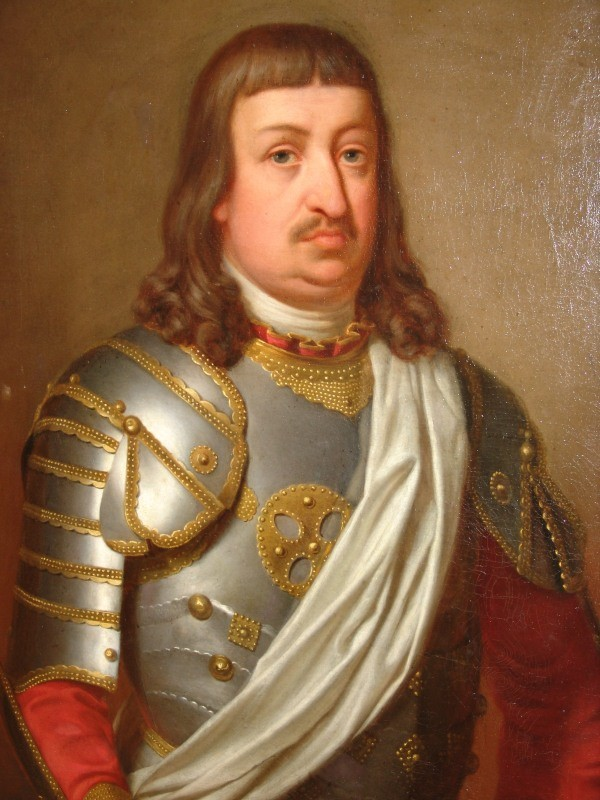
Jan Sobiepan Zamoyski

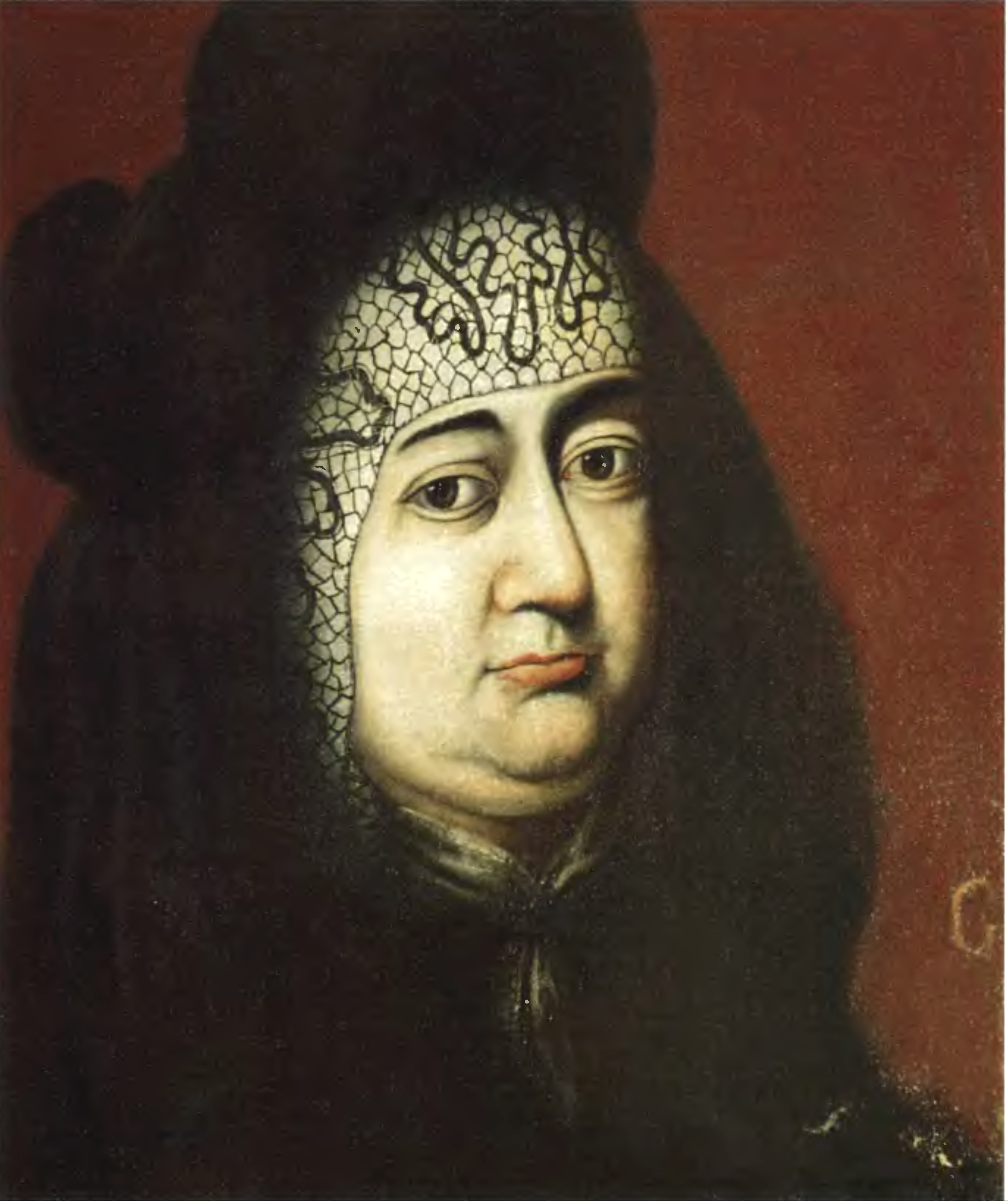
Gryzelda [Zamoyski] Wiśniowiecka
