= Jan Kostka =

Polish noble (c. 1529 – 1581)

- Coat of arms: Dąbrowa
- Born: c. 1529; Sztemberk v. Stążków
- Died: May 31, 1581; Jarosław
- Family: Kostka
- Consort: Jadwiga Przerębska; Zofia Odrowąż
- Issue: with 1555 Jadwiga Przerębska; Stanisław Wojciech Kostka; Jan Kostka; Jadwiga Konopacka; Elzbieta Róza-Zalińska; Anna Tomicka with 1569 Zofia Odrowąż; Jan Kostka; Anna Magdalena Kostka; Anna Kostka; Katarzyna Sieniawska
- Father: Stanisław Kostka
- Mother: Elżbieta z Eilemberku

Jan Kostka (c. 1529 – 1581) was a Polish noble and a candidate in elections for the new King of Poland in 1572. He was also an advisor to Kings Henry of Valois and Stefan Batory.

He was a courtier and a secretary of the King, Podskarbi of Duchy of Prussia since 1555, castellan of Gdańsk in 1556–1574, voivode of Sandomierz Voivodeship since 1574, and president of the Komisja Morska (Sea Commission). He advocated for a union of Royal Prussia with the Crown.

In 1574 and 1575, he was proposed as candidate for King of Poland (see ).
