= Jelita coat of arms =

Polish coat of arms

Jelita
- Battle cry: Jelita, Nagody
- Alternative name(s): Hastae, Jelito, Koźlarogi, Koźle Rogi, Tres Hastae
- Earliest mention: 1316 (seal)
- Cities: Dyneburg (1582–1772), Kraśnik, Tomaszów Lubelski, Józefów Biłgorajski, Zamość, Zwierzyniec
- Gminas: Gmina Dłutów, Gmina Jadów, Gmina Moszczenica, Gmina Morawica, Gmina Tereszpol
- Families: 551 names A Agewski, Ajewski, Alkiewicz, Anszeński, Antonowicz, Aszeński. B Badyński, Balowicz, Barczkowski, Białecki, Białocki, Białowiecki, Bielawski, Bielczewski, Bielski, Biesiad, Biesiadecki, Biesiadowski, Biesiadzki, Bilczewski, Bilczowski, Bliżyński, Bobrykiewicz, Boglewski, Bogurski, Bohyła, Bonin, Borzemski, Borzobohaty, Borzyński, Brodecki, Bukowiński, Bury, Buszkowski. C Chaiński, Chilchen, Chlebowicz, Chorążyna, Chuchrowski, Cielimoński, Cielimowski, Cielmowski, Cieluśnicki, Cieskanowski, Cieszanowski, Czeczel, Czeczela, Czeluściński, Czerkas, Czerkaski, Czerkawski, Czerkies, Czermieński, Czermiński, Czerniński, Czerszyński, Czerwakowicz, Czop, Czubka. D Dąbrowski, Dembowski, Derkaczowski, Dębowski, Dobrożyński, Dobryński, Dobrzyński, Dobuchowski, Drozdowski, Drożewski, Dubowieski, Duranowski, Dyss, Dziadowski, Dziaduski, Działowski, Dzibałtowski, Dziduski, Dziebałtowski, Dzieciątkowski, Dziewałtowski, Dziugłowski, Dziwisz, Dzyryt. F Faliński, Fanuel, Francuz, Francuzewicz, Francuzowicz. G Gajewicz, Gajewski, Gawin, Gawlikowski, Gawłowski, Gąska, Gdeszycki, Gedytt, Gerdut, Gielitko, Gierdud, Gierecki, Giertut, Gierzyński, Gieszyński, Gintowt-Dziewałtowski, Girzyński, Glora, Głowa, Głowacki, Głowaczewski, Głupiecki, Godell, Godzianowski, Godziewski, Godziński, Goliszewski, Gołocki, Gomoliński, Goniprowski, Gorlewski, Gorliwski. H Halczyniecki, Hałoski, Hałowski, Held, Helt, Homolicki. I Idaszewski, Idzelewicz, Idzellewicz, Inowłodzki, Iskrzycki, Iwonia. J Jabłoński, Jacewicz, Jackiewicz, Jagiełłowicz, Jajkowski, Jakliński, Jakowicki, Jakowicz, Jakowiecki, Jaksztowicz, Janicki, Jankiewicz, Jankowski, Jarosławski, Jasieński, Jasiński, Jaworski, Jaykowski, Jazdowski, Jekliński, Jelita, Jelitko, Jelitowski, Jerzbutowicz. K Kaczorowski, Kaleński, Kalina, Kalino, Kaliński, Kaliski, Kalisz, Kałowski, Kamisowski, Kamocki, Kamyszowski, Kaufman, Kędzierzyński, Kępiński, Kicki, Kisielewski, Kliszewski, Kliszowski, Kliziński, Kluszczyński, Kmita, Knyszyński, Kobielski, Kochlewski, Kolbrzyński, Kołyszka, Kołyszko, Komornicki, Konstantynowicz, Kopijewicz, Koprzywnicki, Korytko, Korytkowski, Korytnicki, Korytowski, Korzyński, Kosowski, Kossowski, Koślarowski, Kotlicki, Kowalowski, Koziarowski, Kozielecki, Kozierowski, Koziołkowski, Koziołowski, Koźlarowski, Koźloróg, Kórzyński, Kraiński, Krasieński, Krasowski, Krassowski, Kropiński, Kropiwnicki, Krzęcki, Kuczyński, Kuncewicz, Kusiecki, Kwiatkiewicz, Kwiatkowicz. L Lapczyński, Lasochowski, Lasota, Lassochowski, Lassota, Leniecki, Lganowski, Libicki, Libidzki, Litosławski, Litwicki (Litwifski), Litwinowicz, Litwiński, Lneżeliński, Lochiński, Lochński, Lochyński, Lubecki, Lubicki, Luczeliński, Luczyliński, Luczywiński, Ludkiewicz, Lutkiewicz, Lutkowicz, Lutosławski, Lutostański, Lutoszewski. Ł Łańczyński, Łapczeński, Łapczyński, Łapiński, Łaziński, Łaźnicki, Łaźniński, Łażnicki, Łażniński, Łącki, Łęcki, Łochański, Łochiński, Łochyński, Łodygowski, Łodykowski, Łohyński, Łotocki, Łuczeliński, Łuczyleński, Łuczywiński, Łukiewicz, Łukowicz, Łukowski. M Machnicki, Madurowicz, Majeranowski, Majkowski, Makowski, Makułowicz, Malecki, Maljewski, Małecki, Marcinkowski, Marowicki, Martynowski, Marzęcki, Matecki, Matkiewicz, Micewicz, Michałowski, Michaniewski, Miczewicz, Miekaniewski, Mierski, Mietelski, Minczewski, Mirski, Misiekiewicz, Misiewicz, Misiewski, Misiowski, Misiurewicz, Missiewicz, Missowicz, Mniński, Mniszek, Modrzewski, Mojaczewski, Mojkowski, Mokrski, Mongin, Moraniecki, Moraniewski, Morawicki, Morawiecki, Morawieński, Morowiński, Moroz, Morozewicz, Morozowicz, Morozsz, Moszczański, Moszczeński, Moykowski, Mrawiński, Mrowiński, Mszerewicz, Myszejko, Myszeyko, Myśliborski, Myślicki. N Neronowicz, Nieronowicz, Niewiadomski, Nowosielecki, Nurowski. P Pabianowski, Pacanowski, Pachołowiecki, Padarewski, Paderewski, Pagiewski, Pajewski, Pajowski, Palski, Paprocki, Pawłowski, Peczlewicz, Peczulewicz, Pełczyski, Perlicki, Pęczycki, Pieczkowski, Pieczulewicz, Pieczykowski, Pieniążek, Pietuch, Pijakowski, Piottuch, Piotuch, Piszkowicz, Piwakowski, Plachowicz, Podgórski, Podstękalski, Podstolski, Pokrzywnicki, Poleski, Popczyński, Popławski, Postękalski, Poznański, Pozylewicz, Pratkowski, Promieński, Promiński, Promnicki, Proniewicz, Proszczyński, Przybyłowski, Pudelski, Pudłowski. R Raciborowski, Raczkowski, Radogoscki, Radogoski, Radoszkowski, Rafalski, Raj, Rajczenko, Rajski, Rampalski, Ray, Rayski, Remiesz, Remiszewski, Remiszowski, Reszczewski, Romaszewski, Romer, Romiszewski, Romiszowski, Rosowski, Rospąd, Rospęd, Rozdziałowski, Rozniecki, Rozpąd, Rożniecki, Rożnowski, Rudlicki, Rychcicki, Rychczycki, Rykaczewski, Rymgayło, Rymgayłowicz, Rzepliński. S Sadowski, Salecki, Sancygniowski, Saryusz, Sczerbic, Sczukocki, Secygniewski, Secygniowski, Sędzigniewski, Sieliski, Sielnicki, Sietecki, Silnicki, Skarbek, Skąpski, Skępski, Skierko, Skokocki, Skokowski, Skorkowski, Skórkowski, Skrzynicki, Skrzyniecki, Slowiński, Sławianowski, Słupski, Sokolnicki, Sokołowicz, Sołowicki, Sołowiński, Stanowski, Staropis, Stawirejski, Staworski, Stawowski, Stokowski, Strumecki, Strumieński, Strus, Struś, Strzałkowski, Strzeszkowski, Suchoczaski, Sudimont, Sudkiewicz, Sudymont, Sudywoj, Swarpłowicz, Swieczyk, Sypniewski, Sypniowski, Sypnowski, Syroczyński, Szadkowski, Szarski, Szczekocki, Szczepankiewicz, Szczepankowicz, Szczerbicz, Szczukocki, Szczurowski, Szpachiński, Szpakiński, Szpaliński, Szparkowski, Szubalski, Szydłowski, Szypieński. T Tarnawski, Tarnowski, Tatarski, Tchorzenicki, Tchorznicki, Terlikowski, Tomasz, Trawiński, Trzebiatowski, Tulicki. U Ul. W Wałowski, Wągleszyński, Werburt, Werbut, Węchadłowski, Węgleszyński, Wieloch, Wierzejski, Wierzyński, Wikoszewski, Wikszemski, Wilczkowski, Wilkoszewski, Wilkowski, Wilner, Witkowski, Witorowicz, Witoszyński, Witowicz, Wojciechowski, Wojnowski, Wojtkiewicz, Wolski, Wolski-Saryusz, Wolszleger, Worszyło, Woźnicki, Wrzesiński, Wrzeszyński, Wrześniowski, Wyłaski, Wyrzejski, Wyrzyski. Z Zakrzewski, Zakrzowski, Zaleski, Zalewski, Zamojski, Zamoyski, Zarszyński, Zawisza, Zboiński, Zbojeński, Zdunowski, Zdziechowski, Zelecheński, Zielawski, Zieliński, Zieliński-Saryusz, Zurowski. Ż Żarkowski, Żelawski, Żelecheński, Żelechowski, Żelechyński, Żelesiński, Żeleziński, Żeleżyński, Żełeżyński, Żeromski, Żurawski, Żurowski.

Jelita is a Polish coat of arms. It was used by several szlachta families.

== History ==
One of the oldest Polish coats of arms. First depicted on the seal of Tomisław z Mokrska from 1316.

Additionally, the Polish medieval chronicler, diplomat and soldier Jan Długosz referred to those bearing the Jelita coat of arms as "a clan born in Poland of men who are modestly devoted to dogs and hunting."

== Legend ==
Legend has it that this coat of arms was granted by King Władysław I Łokietek to a peasant soldier (and his family) after the Battle of Płowce (1331) in which the Polish armies defeated the 40,000-strong force of the Teutonic Knights with minimal casualties. The man fought with great courage and only fell in battle when pierced by three spears in the abdominal area which caused his bowels to fall out. Shortly before his death, the King ennobled the fatally wounded man. Hence, the three crossed spears in the coat of arms, as well as the name Jelita, Bowels or Guts.

== Blazon ==
There are three lances of gold (or yellow), displayed in the design of a star on a red field, so that two on the sides are shown with their ends and points upward and the center lance with its point straight downward. on the helmet is a demi goat leaping with its forepaws upward, facing to the right, with horns on its head. The goat on top is the symbol of persistence, practical wisdom and an emblem of a man who wins through diplomacy rather than war. It may also refer to the goat crest of Lublin. The Act of the Union of Lublin, signed in 1569, created the so-called Commonwealth of two Nations, under one monarch, with one parliament and unified monetary systems.

The heraldic motto of this coat of arms is "To mniey boli" (It hurts less).

== Notable bearers ==
Notable bearers of this coat of arms include:

- House of Zamoyski
  - Adam Zamoyski
  - Jan Zamoyski
  - Joanna Barbara Zamoyska
  - Gryzelda Konstancja Zamoyska
  - Jan "Sobiepan" Zamoyski
  - Tomasz Zamoyski
- Florian Pacanowski
- Józef Śliwicki
- Ignacy Jan Paderewski
- Franciszek Dąbrowski
- Stefan Żeromski
- Witold Lutosławski
- Ryszard Kaczorowski
- Jacek Saryusz-Wolski
- Count Petr Mikhaïlovitch Korwin-Litwicki (1796-1856}, titular councillor of the Russian Empire

== Gallery ==
Coat of arms of Counts Zamoyski

Coat of arms of Counts Bielski

Gorłowski (odm.)

Hilchen (odm.)

Geometer (odm.)

Jelita III (odm.)

Koźlakowski (odm.)

Manikowski (odm.)

Maszalski (odm.)

Natalis (odm.)

Serny (odm.)

Sienicki (odm.)

Słowieński (odm.)

Szczerbic (odm.)

Szydłowski (odm.)

Wielkołucki (odm.)

== See also ==
- Polish heraldry
- Heraldic family
- List of Polish nobility coats of arms

== Bibliography ==
- Tadeusz Gajl: Herbarz polski od średniowiecza do XX wieku : ponad 4500 herbów szlacheckich 37 tysięcy nazwisk 55 tysięcy rodów. L&L, 2007. ISBN 978-83-60597-10-1.
- Alfred Znamierowski: Herbarz rodowy. Warszawa: Świat Książki, 2004, s. 112. ISBN 83-7391-166-9.
