= Anna Kostka =

Polish–Lithuanian noblewoman (1575–1635)

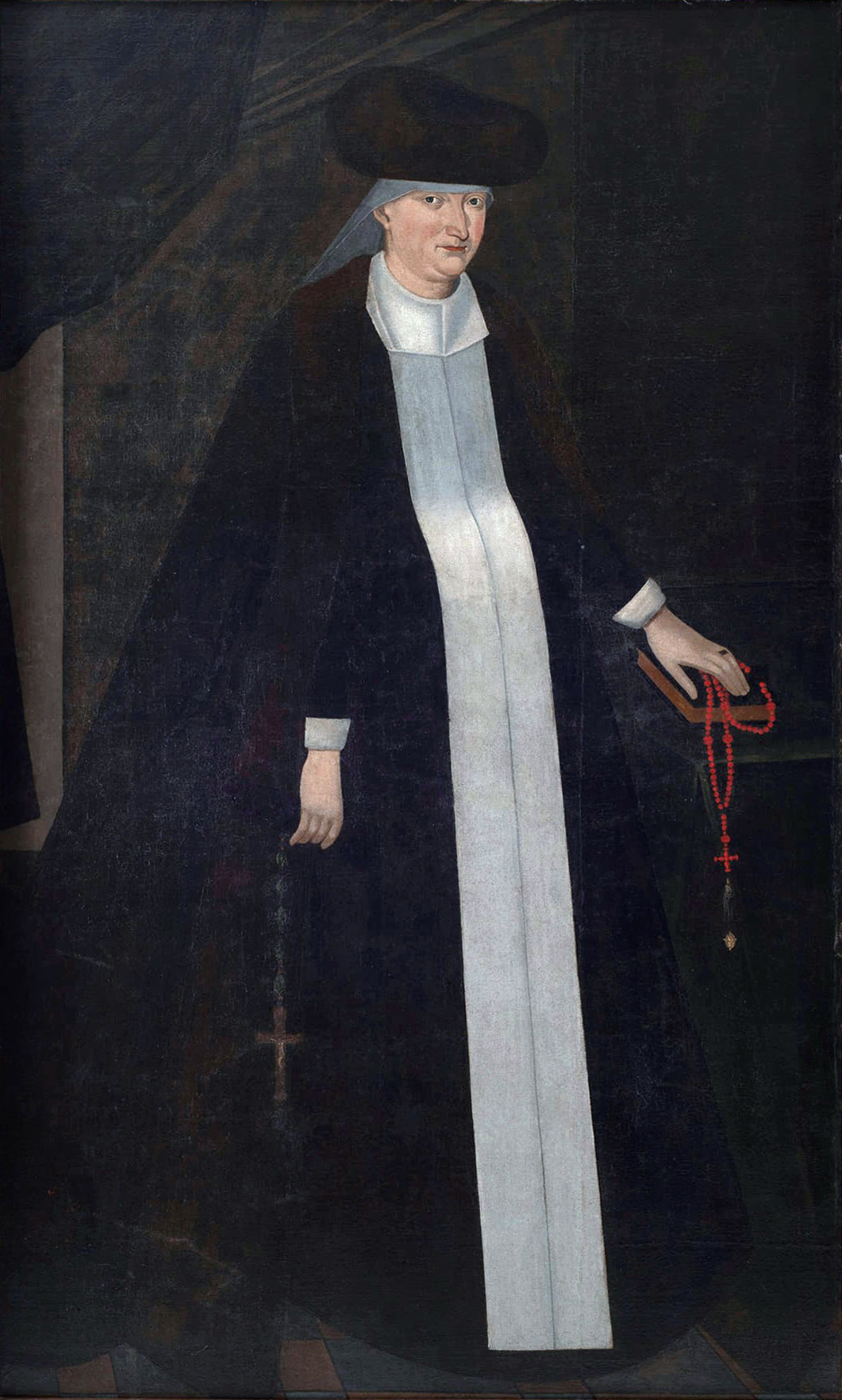
- Coat of arms: Dąbrowa
- Born: 1575
- Died: 1635 (aged 59–60)
- Family: Kostka
- Spouse: Aleksander Ostrogski
- Issue: Zofia Ostrogska; Konstanty Ostrogski; Janusz Ostrogski; Anna Alojza Ostrogska; Katarzyna Ostrogska
- Father: Jan Kostka
- Mother: Zofia Odrowąż

Anna Kostka (1575–1635) was a Polish–Lithuanian noblewoman (szlachcianka).

Anna was the daughter of Jan Kostka and Zofia Odrowąż, and related to Saint Stanislas Kostka. She married Aleksander Ostrogski in 1592. She inherited the city of Jarosław as well as several other areas after her mother.

After being widowed in 1603, she lived an independent life as the manager of her own and her children's dominions. She benefited the university of Jarosław, introduced the Benedictine order to the city, protected the Jesuits, commissioned several later famed art objects for the churches and became known for her charity toward the poor.
