= Ostrogski coat of arms =

Polish coat of arms

Baklay
- Alternative names: Ostrogski I Książe, Ostrogski II, Baklay
- Earliest mention: unknown
- Towns: none
- Families: Ostrogski, Szpil, Szpilewski, Szpilowski, Zasławski

Ostrogski (Latin: Baca – Perl, Latin: Laius – white (without chatoyancy)) is a Polish coat of arms of the Polish–Lithuanian Commonwealth. A variant of the Leliwa and Ogończyk coat of arms.

== History and description ==
Traditional Ostrogski coat of arms was described in his work Kasper Niesiecki, while its iconographic representation is seen on the Ostroh Bible. According to Niesiecki the first (oldest) Ostrogski coat of arms was Pogoń Ruska coat of arms where the Saint George pierces a dragon (see Saint George and the Dragon). During the Battle of Vedrosha on 14 July 1500 the Grand Hetman of Lithuania Konstanty Ostrogski was taken a prisoner by the Muscovite forces and later sent to Vologda. Nikolay Karamzin cites that on 18 October 1506 Ostrogski pledged his allegiance to the Grand Prince of Moscow Vasili III as a boyar, confirmed by the Metropolitan of Moscow Simon. Ostrogski was sent then to the Sloboda Ukraine to fight Tatars, but managed to escape and returned to Lithuania in 1507.

After Konstanty Ostrogski returned from the Muscovite captivity he adopted a new coat of arms (his former coat of arms was to similar to that of the Grand Duchy of Moscow). The new coat of arms was created as a mix of Leliwa and Ogończyk coat of arms, in remembrance of his two sons Eliasz (whose wife Beata Kościelecka was of Ogończyk coat of arms) and Konstanty (whose wife Zofia Tarnowska was of Leliwa coat of arms).

According to the Book of Knowledge of All Kingdoms, the coat of arms for country of Roxia (Ruthenia) was described as a green field with an octagonal star, while its banner consists of two golden half-moons at a silver field pointing with their horns at each other. To the similarity of the description points Roman Klymkevych.

== Notable bearers ==
Notable bearers of this coat of arms include:

- Konstanty Ostrogski (Duke, Grand Hetman of Lithuania.)
- Konstanty Wasyl Ostrogski (Duke, marshal of Volhynia and voivode of the Kiev Voivodeship.)
- Janusz Ostrogski (Voivode of Volhynian Voivodship and castellan of Kraków.)
- Oleksander Ostrogski (Voivode of the Wolhynian Voivodship.)
- Aleksander Janusz Zasławski-Ostrogski (Last of Dukes Ostrogski-Zasławski.)
- Władysław Dominik Zasławski (Voivode of Sandomierz Voivodship.)

== Gallery ==
Ostrogski II

Simple version

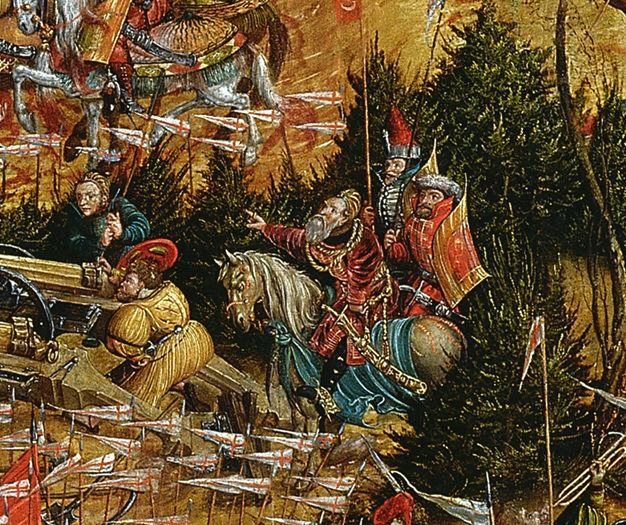
Konstanty Ostrogski with Bacalaius banner (Battle of Orsha)

Coat of arms for the city of Dubno, Ukraine

Coat of arms for the town of Stepan, Ukraine

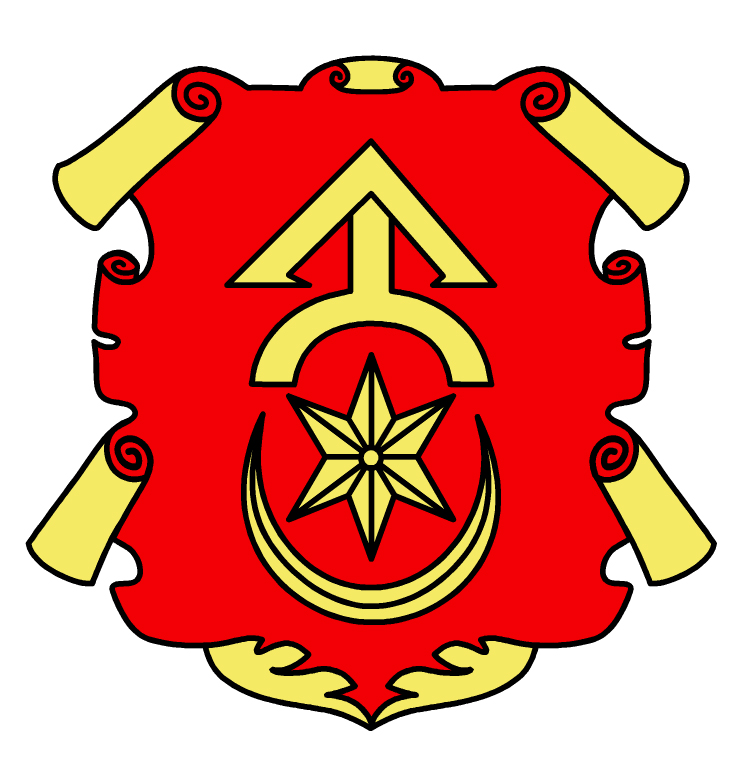
Alternate version

== See also ==
- Ostrogski family
- Zasławski
