= Dąbrowa coat of arms =

Polish coat of arms

Dąbrowa
- Battle cry: Dąbrowa
- Earliest mention: 1421
- Towns: none
- Families: 142 names altogether: Anszlewski, Balukiewicz, Białoskórski, Biały, Boberski, Bogdziewicz, Bogowicz, Boguszko, Boguta, Bogwiłł, Budziński, Budzyński, Chełchowski, Chełkowski, Chociwski, Chomienko, Ciciborski, Ciechanowiecki, Czechański, Dambrowski, Damięcki, Dąbrowa, Dąbrowicz, Dąbrowny, Dąbrowski, Dembowicz, Dombrowicz, Dombrowski, Drocieski, Gardliński, Garliński, Głodkowski, Głodowski, Głotkowski, Górski, Grodkowski, Grzywo-Dąbrowski, Herburtowski, Jabłoński, Jachimowicz, Jakimowicz, Jambramowski, Jankowski, Januszewicz, Januszewski, Jarzębiński, Jazdowski, Jeżowski, Karasiński, Karaś, Karasewicz Karniewski, Karniowski, Kiszka, Kizimowski, Klimaszewski, Klimaszowski, Kobuszewski, Kobuszowski, Koc, Kocowski, Kocz, Kognowicki, Kołacki, Korolkiewicz, Kosko, Koskowski, Kostecki, Kostka, Kowalik, Laskowski, Lauxmin, Lenkowski, Lepkowski, Łaukszmin, Łebkowski, Łepkowska, Łepkowski, Łępkowski, Łoś, Maczeński, Maczyński, Marciszewski, Marczewski, Mazanowicz, Mazonowicz, Miernikiewicz, Miernikowicz, Mikoszewski, Mikoszewski, Mikszewicz, Milewicz, Młodzianowski, Morawski, Murawski, Napierski, Naykowski, Obidzińśki, Openkowski, Opęchowski, Płodownicki, Podkowa, Podolec, Porzecki, Porzycki, Prostyński, Purzycki, Radczenko, Rostkowski, Rymeyko, Rymeykowicz, Rzechowski, Secemiński, Secymiński, Siemieński, Sierzputowski, Sławczyński, Smolechowski, Stromiło, Strumiłło, Strumiło, Szczepanowski, Szkotowski, Tabądzki, Tabęcki, Tabęcki Jurczyk, Tabęski, Talko, Talmont, Tatur, Tołokoński, Tynowski, Wachowicz, Wdzienk, Wdzięk, Wdziękoński, Zalkowski, Zełkowski, Zgierski, Zgirski, Zielonacki, Żalkowski, Żelkowski, Żełkowski, Zięmba

Dąbrowa is a Polish coat of arms originated from the Duchy of Masovia.

== Notable bearers ==
Notable bearers of this coat of arms include:

- Kostka family
  - Katarzyna Kostka
  - Jan Kostka
  - Saint Stanislaus Kostka
- Kiszka family
  - Barbara Kiszka (?–1513), wife of Jerzy Radziwiłł
  - Jan Kiszka (1552–1592), castellan of Wilno and voivode of Brześć
  - Stanisław Kiszka (1584-1626), bishop of Samogitia
  - Janusz Kiszka (1600–1653), voivode and hetman, last of the family
- Ciechanowiecki family
  - Andrzej Ciechanowiecki, art historian, philanthropist, art collector, antique dealer, antiquarian, founder of the Ciechanowiecki Foundation

== See also ==
- Polish heraldry
- Heraldic family
- List of Polish nobility coats of arms

== Bibliography ==
- Bartosz Paprocki. Herby rycerstwa polskiego. Kraków, 1584.
- Simon Okolski. Orbis Polonus. Kraków, 1642. T.1-3.
- Ks. Kacper Niesiecki. Herby i familie rycerskie tak w Koronie jako y w W.X.L. Lwów, 1728.
- Tadeusz Gajl: Herbarz polski od średniowiecza do XX wieku : ponad 4500 herbów szlacheckich 37 tysięcy nazwisk 55 tysięcy rodów. L&L, 2007, s. 406–539. ISBN 978-83-60597-10-1.
