= Ostroh (disambiguation) =

Ostroh may refer to:

- Ostroh, a historic city in Rivne Oblast, Ukraine
- Uherský Ostroh, a town in Zlín Region, Czech Republic
- Ostroh Raion, a former raion of Rivne Oblast, Ukraine
- National University of Ostroh Academy, an autonomous research university in Ukraine
- Ostroh Castle, a castle in Ostroh, Ukraine
- Ostroh Academy, a former academy in Ostróg, Polish–Lithuanian Commonwealth

== See also ==
- Ostrog (disambiguation)
