= Elizaveta Ostrogska =

Ruthenian heiress

Elizaveta Ostrozka
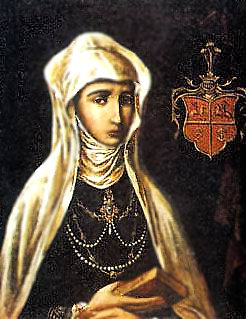

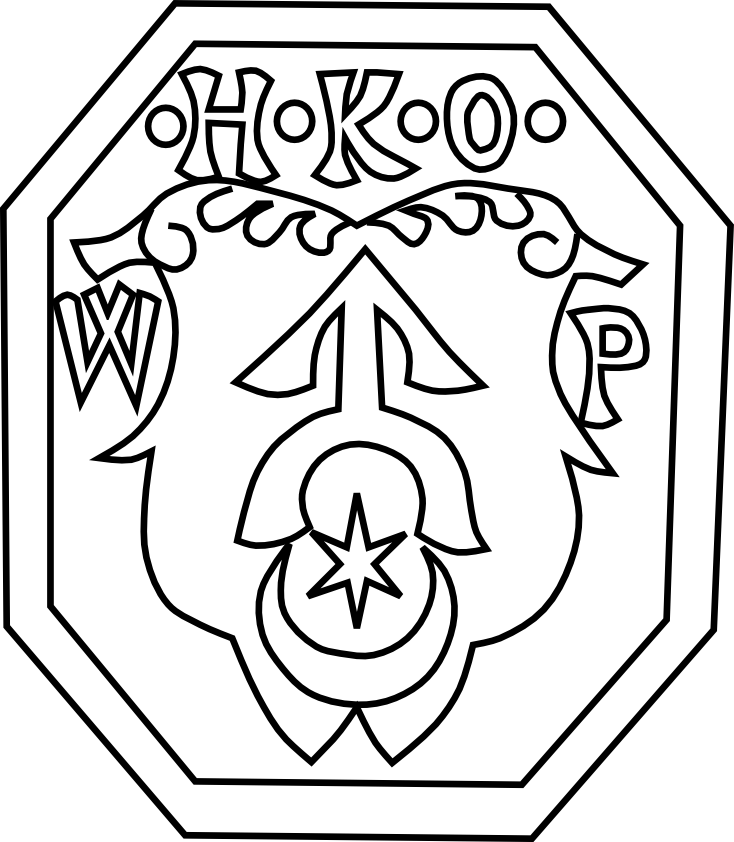
- Coat of arms: Seal of Halshka Ostrozka Ostrogski
- Born: 15 June 1539; Ostrog, Volhynia, Grand Duchy of Lithuania (now Ukraine)
- Died: 1582 (aged 42–43); Volhynia (now Ukraine)
- Family: Ostrogski
- Consort: Dymitr Sanguszko; Łukasz III Górka; Siemion Olelkowicz Slutski
- Father: Ilia Ostrogski
- Mother: Beata Kościelecka

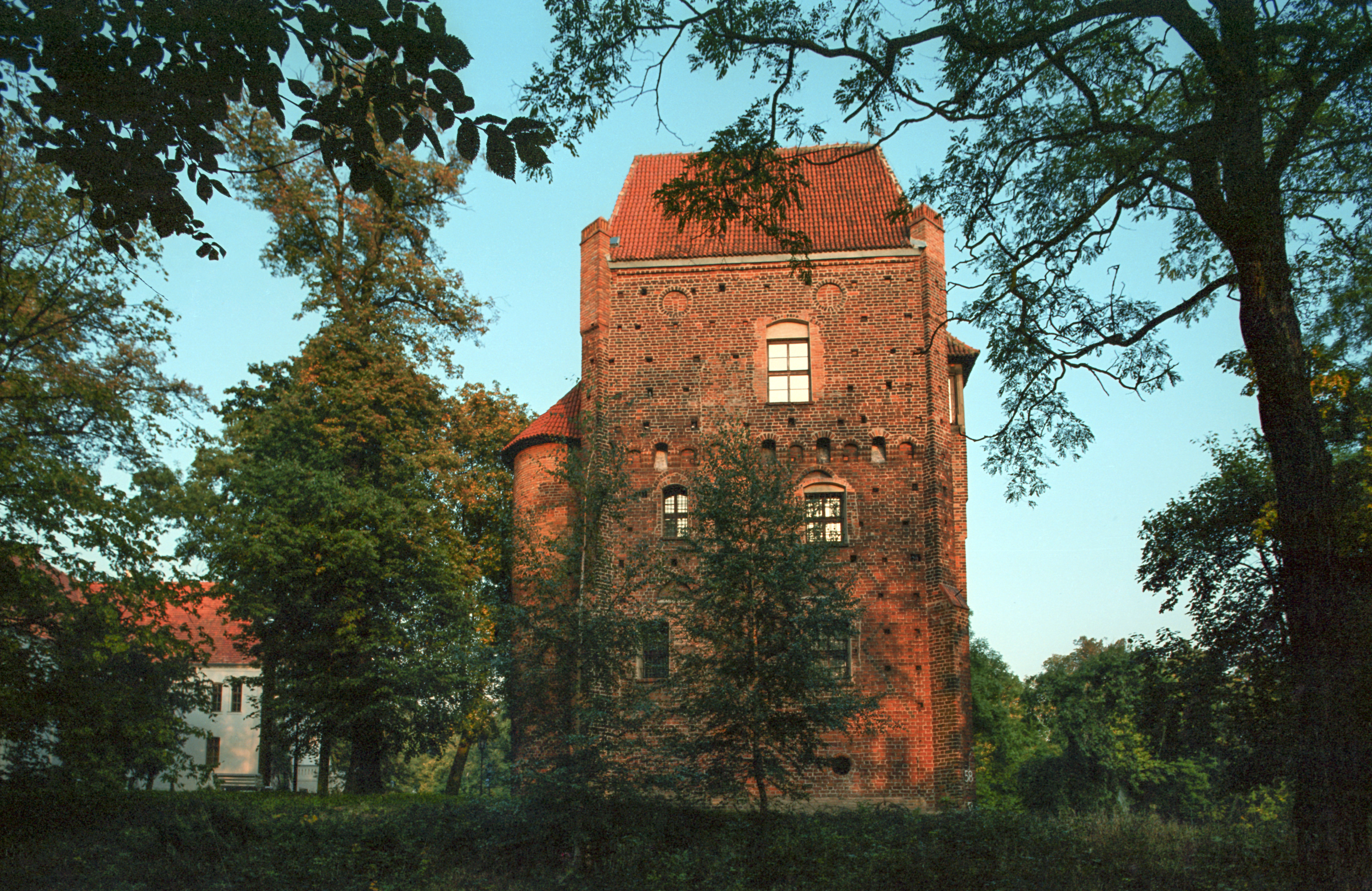
Szamotuły - Halszka Tower

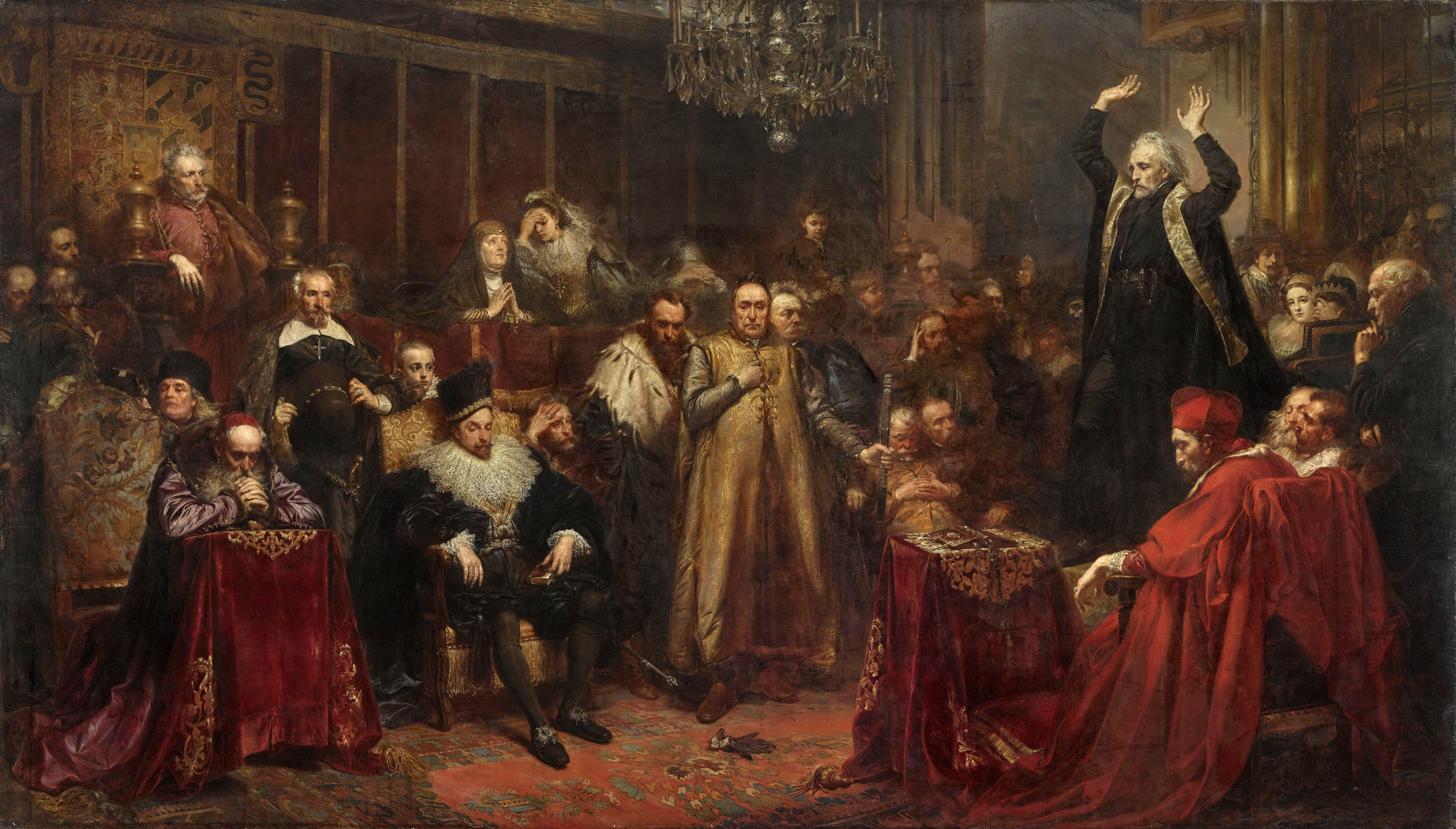
Jan Matejko - Kazanie Skargi

Princess Elizaveta Ostrogska (Ukrainian: Єлизавета (Галшка) Острозька - Yelyzaveta (Halshka) Ostroz'ka; Polish: Elżbieta (Halszka) Ostrogska, 1539–1582), nicknamed Black Princess, was a Ruthenian heiress, the only child of Prince Illia Ostrogski and Beata Kościelecka.

== Early life ==
She was born in the Ostrog castle on 19 June 1539, soon after her father, Illia Ostrogski, died. In the Lithuanian Metrica she is referred to by name, including as Elżbieta, Elizabeth, and Halszka. In accordance with her father's drafted will before his death, her legal guardians were to be the Polish king Sigismund II Augustus, Sigismund's wife Bona Sforza, and Illia's half-brother Konstanty Wasyl Ostrogski. On 12 May 1542, the commissioning of Illia's real estate was finished, with his wife Beata getting one-third of his holdings and Elizaveta getting two-thirds. Her two-thirds consisted of the castles in Polonne, Krasyliv, and Chudniv, the Góry estate, a house in Vilnius, and 1/5 of the income from Ostrog. The annual income, in total, of Elizaveta's holdings amounted to 436 kopa of money, which was a significant sum at the time. Her mother was to administer all of the child's holdings, except the Góry estate and the Vilnius house, which were to be managed to Konstanty.

== First marriage to Dymitr Sanguszko ==
By the time she turned 13, which was the age considered acceptable for marriage, she was already being courted by many to take possession of her holdings including by Dymitr Sanguszko, Martyn Zborowski, and Mykolai Melenetsky. There is a rumour that Dmytro Vyshnevetsky was also allegedly interested in her, which led to his eventual lifelong bachelorhood, but this has not been confirmed. Subsequently, Konstanty chose Sangushko to be Halshka's temporary guardian, mostly motivated by Konstanty desire to choose his own candidate and ensure control over the Ostrog estates. After a series of failed negotiations with her mother, Beata, when she was 14, her uncle Konstanty Wasyl Ostrogski, against the will of her mother, made her marry Sanguszko, who was then the starost of Kaniv, Cherkasy and Zhytomyr, in September 1553 at the Epiphany Cathedral of Ostrog. Sanguszko captured Ostroh and forcibly engaged with Halszka, bringing her to Kaniv. Beata issued a complaint to king Sigismund II Augustus, which resulted in Sanguszko having to appear before a royal court in Knyszyn in January 1554, which he did not, resulting in a decree of banishment. Dymitr was then forced to flee from persecution, taking Halszka with him. The two sought refuge in the Holy Roman Empire at the castle in Roudnice nad Labem, which was then owned by Jan Tarnowski who was the father-in-law of Konstanty Wasyl Ostrogski, but Sanguszko was soon captured while attending a wedding party in the town of Lyso and killed in Jaroměř by Marcin Zborowski on 3 February 1554.

Some sources allege that after Dymitr's death, in 1554, Halshka gave birth to a son by Dymitr. Due to Halshka's circumstances at the time, it is said that she gave up the infant for adoption to the Nalyvaiko family in Husiatyn. It has thus been hypothesized that the child was Severyn Nalyvaiko, who was Hetman of the Ukrainian Cossacks and led the Nalyvaiko Uprising, but this has never been reliably confirmed.

== Second marriage to Łukasz Górka ==
In 1555 the King of Poland, Sigismund II Augustus, forced Halszka to marry Łukasz Górka, voivode of Poznań, Kalisz, Łęczyca and Brześć Kujawski. This happened again against her and her mother's will, as Beata wanted Halszka to marry Siemion Olelkowicz, Prince of Slutsk. Both mother and daughter fled to Lviv and hid in the Dominican Church. Prince Siemon slipped into the church dressed like a beggar and secretly married Princess Ostrozka in March 1559. The King however didn't recognize it and issued a royal mandate ordering Prince Siemon to give Elizaveta back to Górka. The church was besieged, and mother and daughter were forced to surrender and accept the King's will.

Halszka was brought by Górka to his castle in Szamotuły, where she was kept for 14 years. Górka allegedly forced her to wear a mask, and the only place she was allowed to visit was the nearby church connected to her cell through a tunnel. Due to this, the castle was called in legend the "Black Tower", and Halszka herself earned the nickname "Black Princess". Halszka's inheritance had been awarded to Olelkowicz at Beata's insistence, but in a few months the prince was murdered, and his severed hand was reportedly sent to Halszka along with his engagement ring. Soon thereafter Beata married Sieradz voivode Olbracht Łaski.

== Subsequent fate and philanthropic activities ==
After Górka's death in 1573, Halszka was finally able to regain her freedom. She returned to Ostroh and was accepted by her uncle Konstanty Wasyl Ostrogski. Halszka wished to marry Jan Ostroróg, but the marriage was prevented by Ostrogski. In her later years Halszka led an ascetic life and was reported to suffer from mental illness. She died at the age of 42 in 1582. In her testament Halszka left part of her inheritance for the academy and printing house of Ostroh. She had previously, in 1579, provided a large endowment for the academy, 6,000 kopa, which was a significant sum of money. For this, she was called the first female philanthropist in Ukraine.

== Inspirations ==
Her tragic story was told in Józef Ignacy Kraszewski's book Halszka (Wilno 1838).

Jan Matejko pictured her in the background of Kazanie Skargi.

There is a legend about one of the Szamotuły castle towers, that it was the prison for a "dark princess", whose face was hidden behind an iron mask by her husband.

In 1971 Ihor Kalynets dedicated a cycle of poems to Halszka.

== See also ==
- House of Ostrogski
- Lithuanian nobility
- List of szlachta
