= Beata Łaska =

Polish magnate heiress (1515–1576)

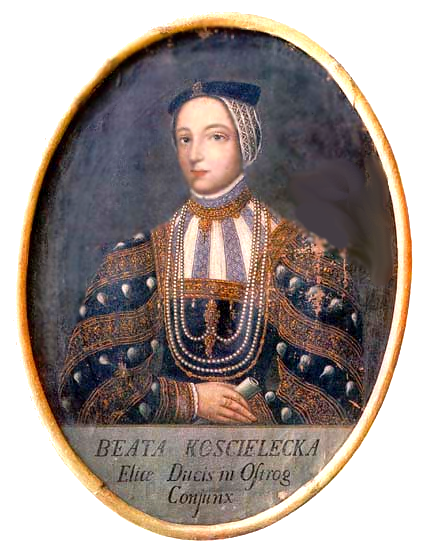
- Born: 1515
- Died: 1576 (aged 60–61); Košice
- Spouses: Illia Ostrogski; Olbracht Łaski
- Issue: Elizaveta Ostrogska
- Father: Andrzej Kościelecki (ill.) Sigismund I the Old
- Mother: Katarzyna Telniczanka

Beata Łaska (1515–1576), was a Polish magnate heiress. She was reputed to be the illegitimate daughter of king Sigismund I the Old.

She was the daughter of Andrzej Kościelecki and Katarzyna Telniczanka and married to Illia Ostrogski (d. 1539) in 1539, and Olbracht Łaski in 1564. She served as maid-of-honour to queen Bona Sforza prior to her marriage. She was the mother of Elizaveta Ostrogska.

She is known for her famous feud with her son-in-law. She married Łaski to have an ally against her son-in-law, but instead, he stole her fortune, had her imprisoned and committed bigamy. The case became a scandal and was brought before the emperor in a famed court case in 1573.

== Biography ==
The marriage of her parents caused turmoil in the country, in 1498, Beata's mother, Katarzyna Telniczanka became Prince Sigismund Jagiellon (later Sigismund I the Old), mistress. In 1510, Katarzyna married Andrzej Kościelecki, and in 1515 Beata was born, and in speculation was believed to be the illegitimate daughter of Sigismund I.

She was raised in the court of Bona Sforza in which she met Illia Ostrogski and through a letter from Jost Decius to Prince Albrecht, Beata and Illia were supposedly married (December 29, 1538). Illia died a year later in 1539. Together they had one daughter, Elizaveta Ostrogska

Beata spent many years in court with her son-in-law Łukasz Górka. Tired of the ongoing fight, she sought a protector, entering into a marriage in 1564 with the voivode of Sieradz, Olbracht Łaski. Immediately after the wedding, he took her to Hungary, where he convinced Kościelecka to sign over her estate to himself. When she finally agreed, Olbracht Łaski imprisoned her in the castle in Kežmarok, where he kept her in poverty and strict confinement without contact with outsiders for eight years. She converted to Catholicism in 1568.

Beata's case became of interest only in 1573, when the emperor ordered the starost of Upper Hungary to conduct an investigation. This was also influenced by the fact that in the meantime it was revealed that Łaski had entered into a bigamous marriage with the Frenchwoman Sabina de Sauve.

Beata Łaska is considered by some to be the first known female tourist in the Tatra Mountains.

== Sources ==
- Nyka Józef: Beata Łaska – pierwsza turystka tatrzańska, w: "Wierchy" R. 29 (1960), wyd. Kraków 1961, s. 78-88.
