= Hryhoriy Arshynov =

Ukrainian civil engineer and activist (1961–2020)

Hryhoriy (Grisha) Arshynov (Ukrainian: Григорий Аршинов; 1961 – 1 November 2020) was a Ukrainian Jewish civil engineer and activist. He spearheaded the restoration of the 17th-century Great Maharsha Synagogue and the Jewish cemetery in Ostroh.

== Career ==
He was born in Ostroh into an assimilated Jewish family. Arshynov was originally trained as a construction specialist, but became involved in documenting the history of the Jewish community is Ostroh in the 1980s, specifically regarding the local Jews who were killed during the Holocaust. In the 1990s, he became the head of the Jewish community in Ostroh, where he specifically advocated for the preservation of Jewish heritage sites across Ostroh. For example, he worked in returning matzevahs to the Jewish cemetery in Zaliztsi after the stones were previously used for construction material. He also later became the head of Ostroh's city council.

Arshynov first became involved in restoring the Great Maharsha Synagogue after he read an article in 2015 by architectural historian Sergey Kravtsov detailing the synagogue's state of disrepair following its use as a Soviet warehouse. He then underwent a four-year restoration effort, which was funded through a combination of personal contributions and fundraising totaling $180,000. In November 2018, a mezuza was affixed to the synagogue's entrance, marking a milestone in its restoration. He continued to oversee the project until his death in 2020.

== Personal life ==
Arshynov's older children immigrated to the United States.

Arshynov died on 1 November 2020, of complications from COVID-19. He was buried in the Jewish cemetery of Ostroh.

== Publications ==
Khrystyna Semeryn. Der Mann, Der ein Gewolde Trug | Чоловік, який тримав склепіння. Gel:blau, 2022. [The Man Who Held Up the Vault. Literary reportage]
