= Illia Ostrogski =

Polish noble

Ilia Ostrogski
- Coat of arms: Ostrogski coat of arms
- Full name: Eliasz Aleksander Konstantyn Ostrogski
- Born: 1510
- Died: 15 August 1539 (aged 28–29)
- Family: Ostrogski
- Consort: Beata Kościelecka
- Issue: Elizaveta (Halszka) Ostrogska
- Father: Konstanty Ostrogski
- Mother: Tatiana Koretska

Eliasz Aleksander Ostrogski (1510–1539), also known as Illia Ostrogski, was the only son of Konstanty Ostrogski from his first marriage with Tatiana Koretska. He was starost of Bratslav and Vinnytsia.

== Biography ==
When he was 13, his father Konstanty agreed with Jerzy Radziwiłł to wed Illia and Anna Elżbieta Radziwiłł. In 1537, Illia cancelled the agreement and was offered the hand of Barbara Radziwiłł, younger sister of Anna Elżbieta. Illia refused and married his love Beata Kościelecka.

On 3 February 1539 Illia married Beata Kościelecka, rumoured to be an illegitimate daughter of King Sigismund I the Old and Katarzyna Telniczanka. The ceremony took place at Wawel Castle, one day after the wedding of Isabella Jagiellon and Hungarian King John Zápolya. At that time Illia converted to Roman Catholicism. The wedding was lavish and included tournaments. Illia duelled with Sigismund II Augustus and was defeated. He was thrown off his horse and "beaten so badly, that for 6 months was complaining". The injuries possibly became the reason of his death on 15 August 1539.

Illia's only daughter, Elizaveta (Halszka), born after his death. According to his testament, Elizaveta was placed under protection of Sigismund II Augustus.
