= Tetiana Ovsiichuk =

Ukrainian production designer (born 1995)

- Тетяна Володимирівна Овсійчук
- Born: 27 June 1995 (age 31); Ostroh, Rivne Oblast, Ukraine
- Education: National Academy of Visual Arts and Architecture
- Occupation: Production designer
- Awards: Shevchenko National Prize

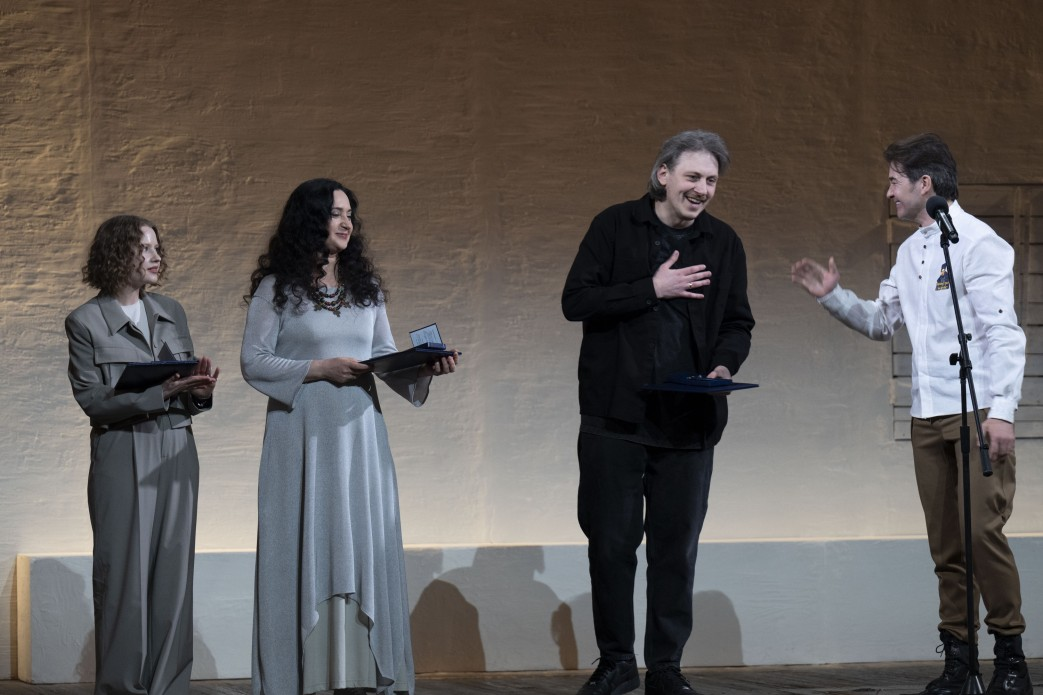
The creative team of the play Konotop Witch (Tetiana Ovsiichuk, Susanna Karpenko, Ivan Uryvskyi) and Yevhen Nyshchuk at the awarding of the Taras Shevchenko National Prize of Ukraine (March, 2024)

Tetiana Ovsiichuk (Ukrainian: Тетяна Володимирівна Овсійчук; born 27 June 1995) is a Ukrainian production designer known for her contributions to theater and scenography. She was born in Ostroh, part of the Rivne Oblast, Ukraine.

== Biography ==
Tetiana Ovsiichuk was born on 27 June 1995 in Ostroh, Rivne Oblast.

In 2022, she graduated from the National Academy of Visual Arts and Architecture (studio of Merited Figure of Arts of Ukraine Andrii Oleksandrovych-Dochevskyi and Serhii Masloboishchykov). She lives in Kyiv.

From 2021, he has been a production designer at the Ivan Franko National Academic Drama Theater.

She created images for performances:

- "The Witch of Konotop" by H. Kvitka-Osnovianenko (2023, set and costume designer);
- "Talentless" by I. Karpenko-Karyi (2021, production designer);
- "Caligula" by A. Camus, "The Career of Arturo Ui, which could have been stopped" by B. Brecht (both 2022), "Maria Stuart" by F. Schiller (2024, all – costume designer).

== Awards ==
- Taras Shevchenko National Prize of Ukraine (5 March 2024) – for the play Konotop Witch based on the novel by Hryhorii Kvitka-Osnovianenko at the Ivan Franko National Academic Drama Theater.
