= National University of Ostroh Academy =

Public university in Ostroh, Ukraine

Coordinates: 50°19′45″N 26°30′46″E

- Національний університет «Острозька академія»
- Latin: Староадемічний корпус Острозької академії.jpg
- Type: Public
- Established: 1576 (as Ostroh Academy); 1994
- Accreditation: Ministry of Education and Science of Ukraine
- Rector: E. M. Balashov
- Location: Ostroh, Rivne Oblast, 35800, Ukraine
- Campus: 2 Seminarska Street
- Website: www.oa.edu.ua/en
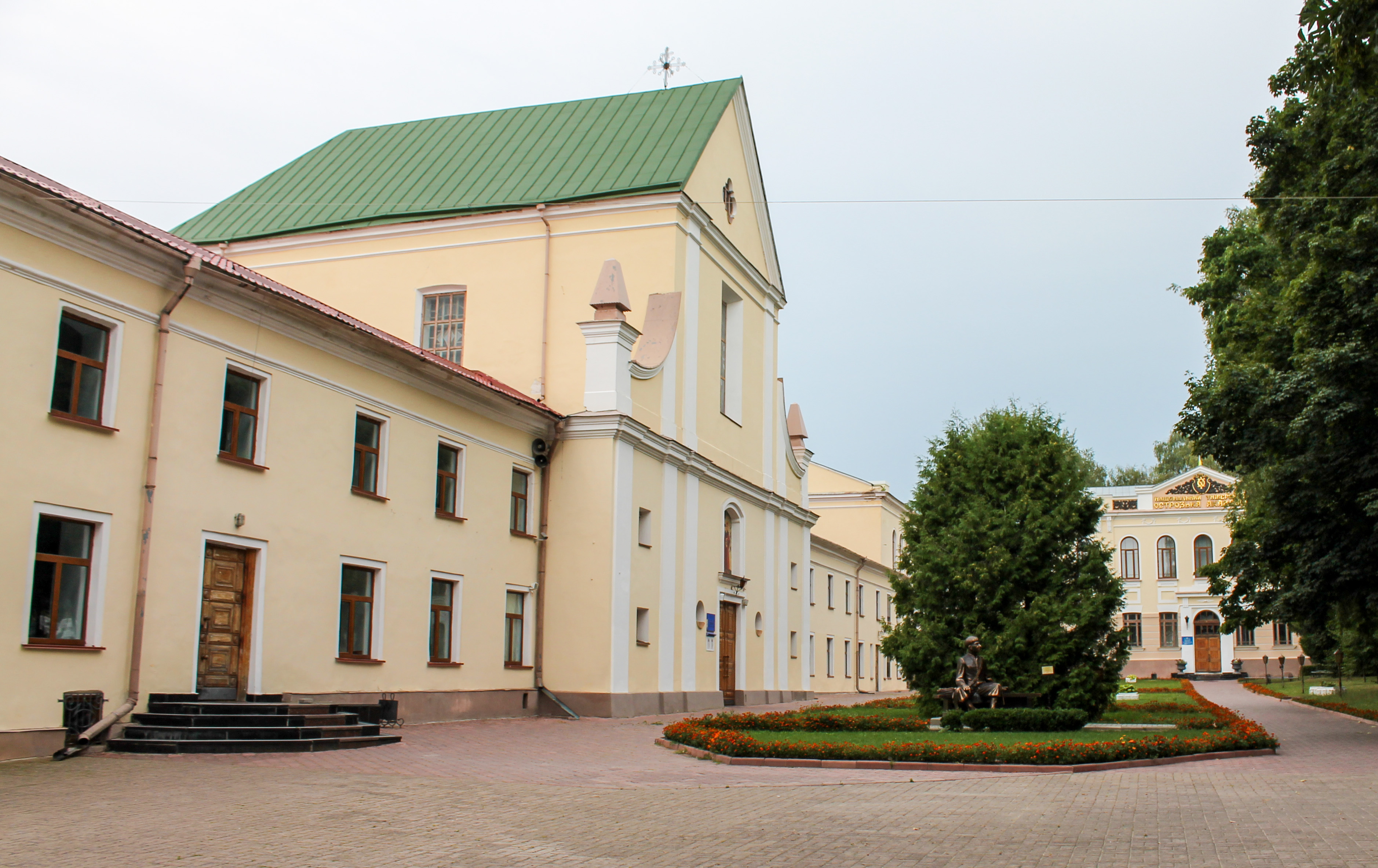

University rankings

Regional – Overall
- QS Emerging Europe and Central Asia: 301-350 (2022)

The National University of Ostroh Academy (abbr. NUOA, Ukrainian: Національний Університет "Острозька Академія", НаУОА, romanized: Natsional'nyi Universytet 'Ostroz'ka Akademiia') is a Ukrainian self-governed (autonomous) research university established by the Presidential Decree of April 12, 1994. The university considers itself a continuation of the historic Ostroh Academy which was the first East-European higher school (dates back to 1576).

Ostroh is an ancient town. The first mention of it dates back to 1100; however, its fate was determined in the 14th century. It was then that the princes Ostrozkyis took possession of the town.

Representatives of this dynasty became famous as renowned political, cultural and religious figures. Over time, the town turned into a strong fortress that hosted centres of crafts and trade within its walls. In the 16th century, Ostroh became one of the largest Ukrainian cities. As a large and important city, Ostroh was marked on most Western European maps. At the same time, it began to be perceived as a key centre of cultural, educational and religious life.

Ostroh is called "The Volyn Athens" and mainly it is because of Ostroh Academy. The poet Penkalsky wrote in 1600: “The muse lodged in jail, even the god of art Apollo has left the island of Delos and moved to Ukraine”.

Ostroh Academy occupies the buildings of the former Rococo Capuchin monastery (built in 1779). This higher educational institution is the only elite university of Ukraine that is not located in a regional capital.

== History ==
Ostroh Academy was founded in 1576 by the prince Vasyl-Kostiantyn Ostrozkyi, in the modern-Ukraine lands which the prince’s family owned. The Academy in Ostroh is considered to be the first institution of higher education in Ukraine.

Ostroh Academy was based on the traditional Western European education system, presupposing the simultaneous study of the languages to interpret the Holy Scriptures – Greek, Latin and Biblical Hebrew.

Ostroh Academy preserved the study of Latin and Greek and supplemented them with local, bookish Slavonic language. The students also mastered Polish and Biblical Hebrew. Because of this, the system of education was a synthesis of two different types of culture. This determined the originality and uniqueness of this educational institution.

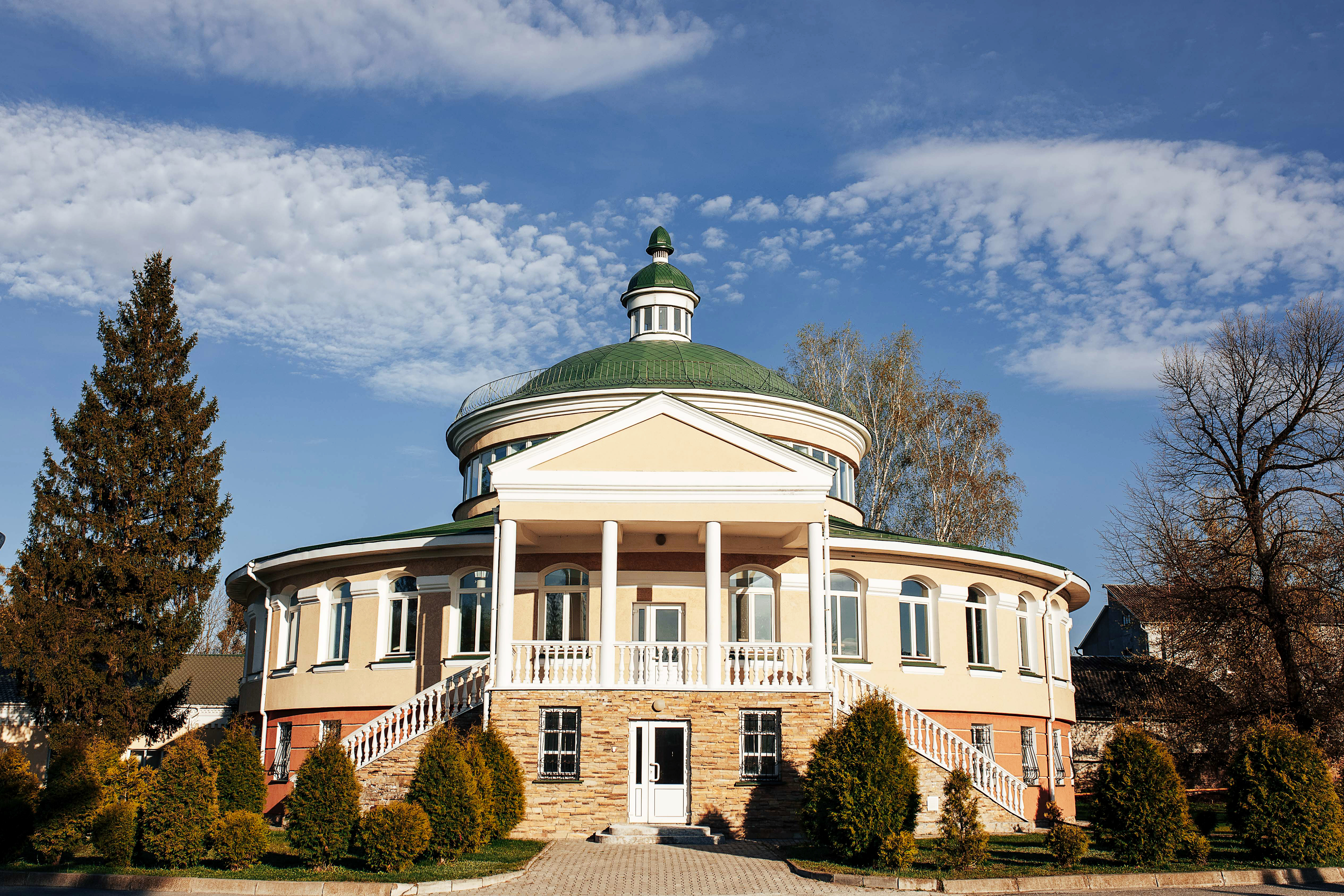
Scientific Library

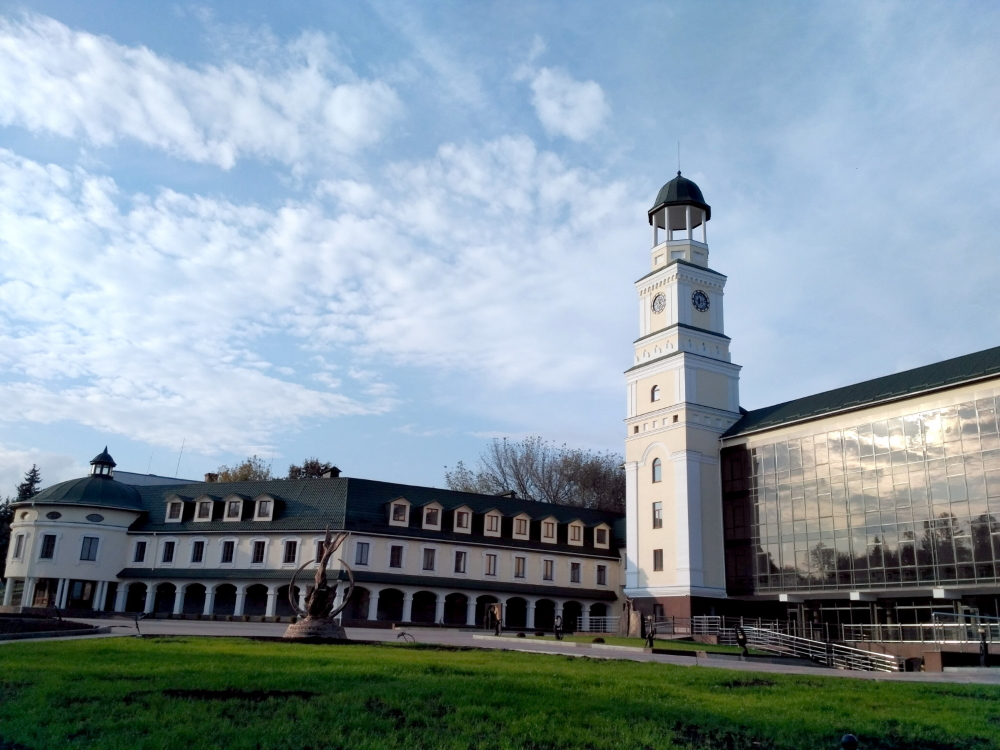
New academic campus

In addition to languages, Ostroh Academy studied the seven liberal arts: the sciences of trivium traditional for European schools (grammar, rhetoric, and dialectic) and quadrivium (arithmetic, geometry, astronomy, and music). Higher Sciences that included philosophy, theology and medicine, were also taught in Ostroh. High standards of education and teaching were supported by a rich collection of books.

The institution finally closed in 1636 soon after opening the Jesuit College in Ostroh (in 1624).

On April 12, 1994, the President of Ukraine Leonid Kravchuk issued a decree On Establishing Ostroh Higher Collegium. After 358 years of oblivion, a new page in the history of the institution in Ostroh began. The modern University's founding rector is Ihor Pasichnyk. National University of Kyiv-Mohyla Academy was a key lobbyist for and partner in the revival of National University Ostroh Academy. Nowadays the Ostroh Academy maintains strong relationships with NaUKMA. Both universities were the only higher educational institutions in Central and Eastern Europe at the respective time.

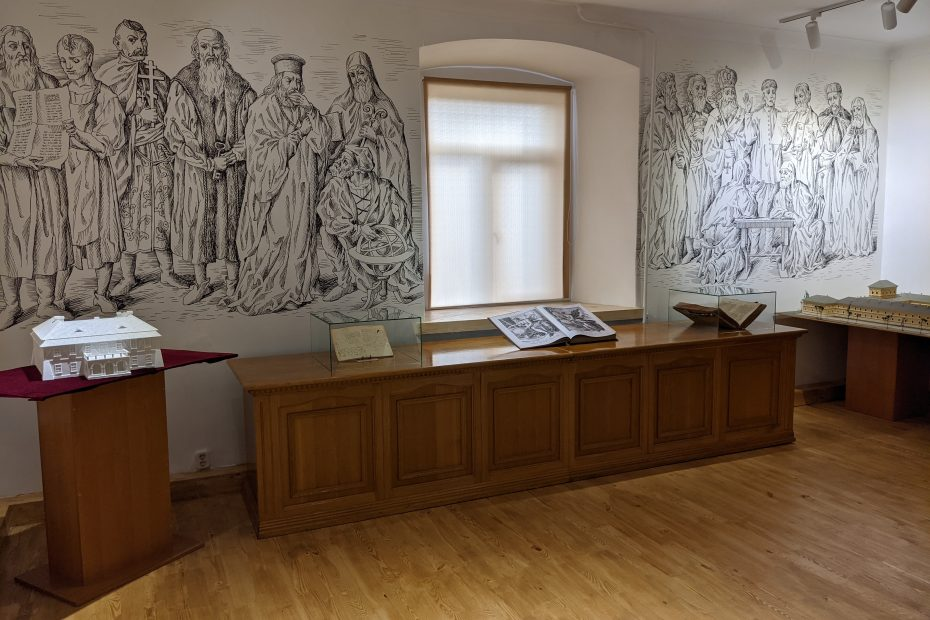
Museum of History

It was pretty challenging to revive a higher education institution in a small town, in a state that had just recovered its independence and did not know enough about its own history.

On January 22, 2000, a presidential decree granted Ostroh Academy the status of a university, and on October 30, 2000, the level of a national university.

In 2009, the University became one of the 14 research universities in Ukraine. In the next year in 2010 NaUOA became a member of the European Association of Universities.

Ostroh Academy is one of the five leaders among the best classical universities in Ukraine, has an international trophy For Quality, ranks second in terms of teaching in the international ranking of World University Rankings. The University is a ten-time nominee of the Book of Records of Ukraine in the category “Mass Events”, also twice was included in the Guinness Book of Records.

=== Publishing ===
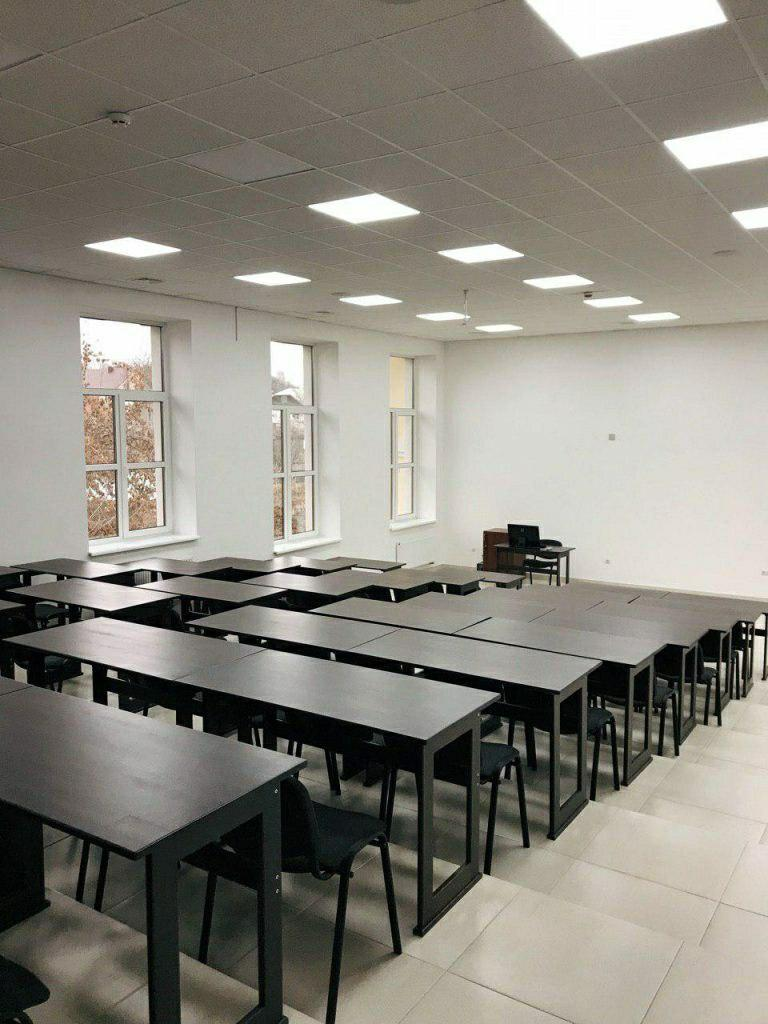
Auditorium in the New academic campus

In 1577–1579, Ivan Fedorovych arrived to the Academy from Lviv and founded a printing house. Under his direction, the most prominent Old Ukrainian Cyrillic printed materials were published. The most famous product is the Slavic Ostroh Bible (1581) - the first complete Bible in the history of printing published in the Slavonic language. It is considered a masterpiece of old-Ukrainian polygraphy and that played an enormous role in the Orthodox education.

== Campus ==
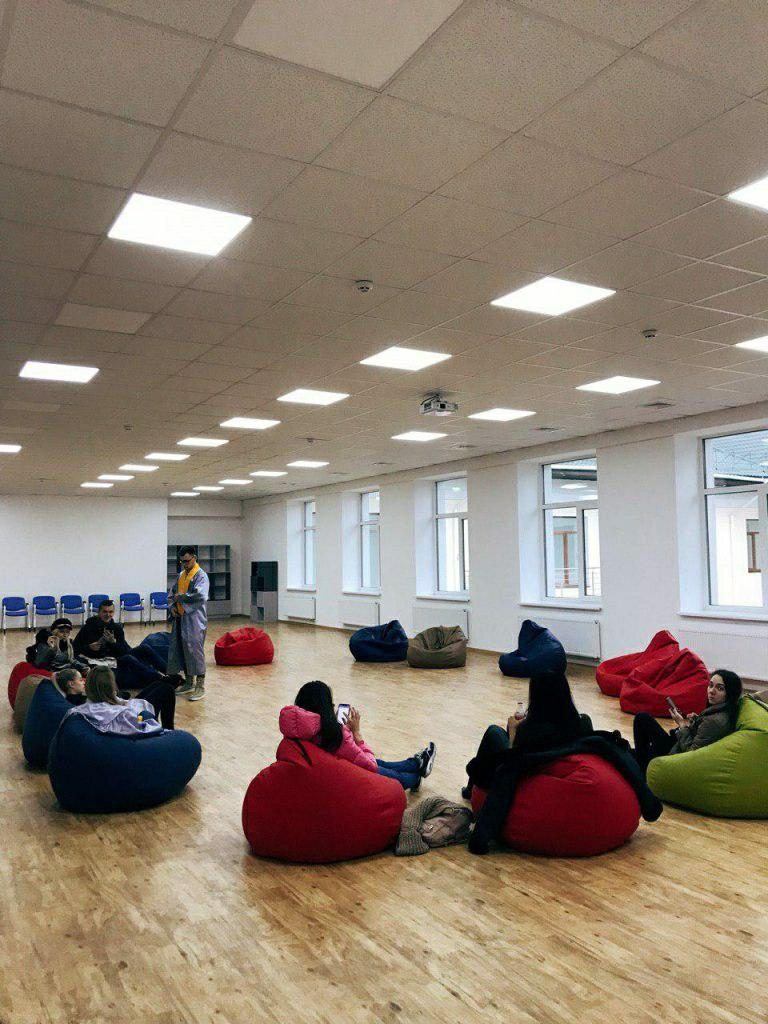
Auditorium in the New academic campus

=== Departments ===
- Educational and Scientific Institute of Social and Humanitarian Management;
- Faculty of Romance and Germanic Languages;
- Educational and Scientific Institute of Law by I.Malynovskyi;
- Faculty of Economics;
- Educational and Scientific Institute of International Relations and National Security.

=== International cooperation ===
The International Relations Department of the National University of Ostroh Academy actively conducts activities aimed at the development of international relations with foreign educational institutions, research institutions, foreign educational organizations and foundations

The students and teachers undergo internships and training in the USA, Canada, Germany, Poland, Italy, Spain, Greece, Turkey, Lithuania, Switzerland, Sweden, France, Great Britain and other countries of the world. The University expands opportunities for students to participate in international academic mobility programs. Every year, the number of such programs, as well as the list of specialties participating in these programs, is growing.

Since 2015, Ostroh Academy has been operating within the framework of the Erasmus+ program. During this time, it was possible to create an extensive network of partners from all over Europe, to establish cooperation in the field of academic and professional exchanges. Partners of Ostroh Academy within the framework of Erasmus+ are 7 countries of the world, such as Poland, Lithuania, Romania, Portugal, Spain, Slovakia, and the Czech Republic. In addition, the University operates semester student exchange programs based on bilateral inter-university cooperation agreements:

- Pomeranian Academy (Słupsk, Poland);
- Warsaw University (Warsaw, Poland);
- University of Hradec Králové (Hradec Kralove, Czech Republic);
- University of Humanities and Natural Sciences in Częstochowa (Poland).

As part of the agreement on academic cooperation with the University of Warsaw, a joint master's program with the issuance of diplomas of both parties in the field of Eastern Studies is being successfully implemented.

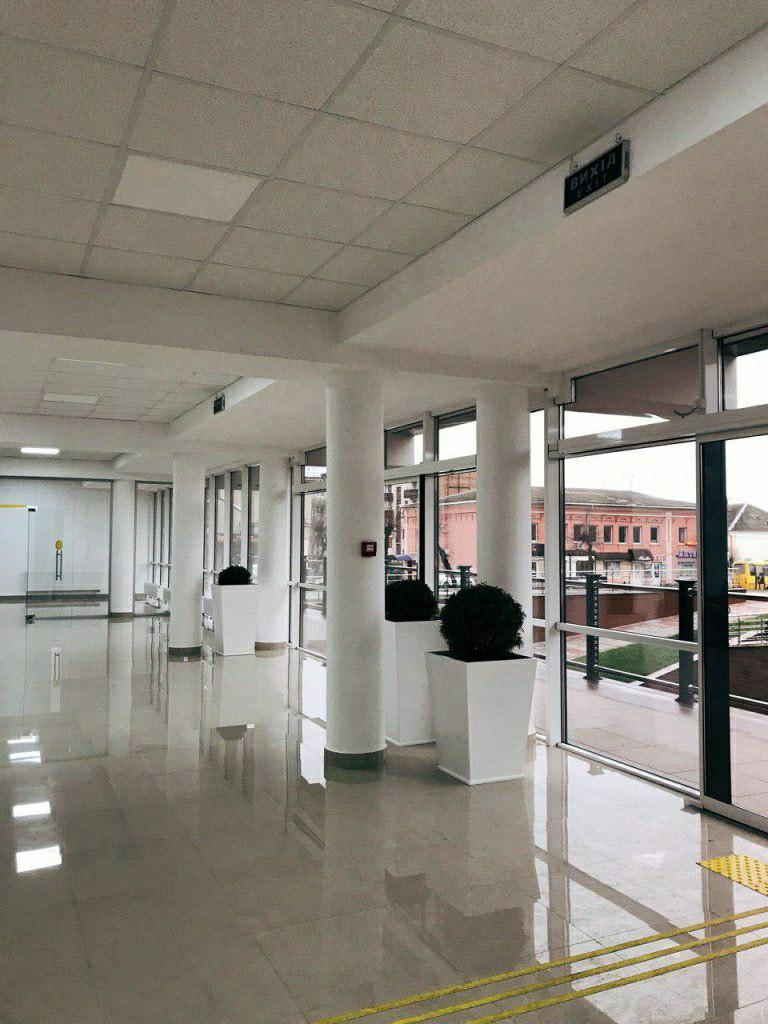
New academic campus

For the last 10 years the students of the National University of Ostroh Academy have annually participated in such internship and educational programmes as Canadian-Ukrainian Parliamentary Program (CUPP), Fulbright Graduate Program, Edmund Muskie Program, Lane Kirkland Program, Study Tours to Poland, one year degree and non-degree studies at Warsaw University, four year studies at University of Marie Curie Sklodowska.

== Rankings and achievements ==
Ostroh Academy is one of the five leaders among the best classical universities in Ukraine, has an international trophy For Quality, and ranks second in terms of teaching in the international ranking of World University Rankings. The University is a ten-time nominee of the Book of Records of Ukraine in the category "Mass Events" also twice included in the Guinness Book of Records.

The National University of Ostroh Academy is the only Ukrainian University recorded in the Guinness World Records. For 456 hours recorded on watches about three thousand participants reread «Kobzar» 45 times, and those were 11 250 poems.

The National University participates in such well-known world university rankings as THE Impact Ranking, QS (EECA), U-Multirank, UI GreenMetric.

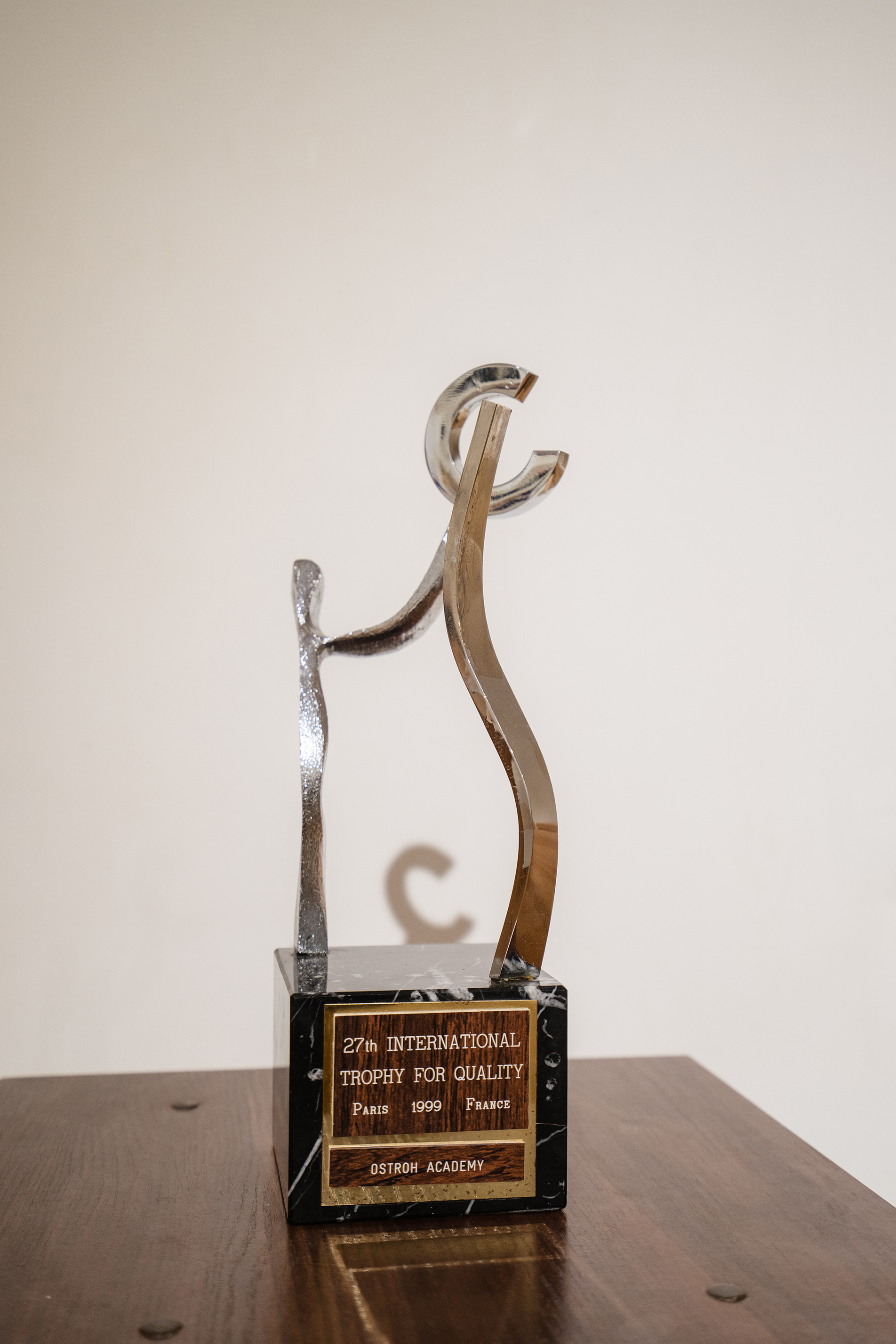
7th international award “For Quality”, 1999, the University was awarded for the high quality of educational technologies, Paris

During the period of its revival, the National University of Ostroh Academy has received high marks not only in Ukraine but also abroad

- third place among classical universities and sixth place in the ranking of universities in Ukraine in terms of quality of entrants according to the results of the project Higher Education in Ukraine;
- tenth place among Ukrainian universities in the ranking of universities QS-2018;
- the second place among the Ukrainian HEIs in the world rankings of universities IU GreenMetric 2022;
- sixth place among Ukrainian higher education institutions according to the international ranking Round University Ranking;
- in the top ten rankings of transparency of national universities (The Center for the Study of Society);
- member of the Consortium of Ukrainian Universities and the University of Warsaw;
- member of the Eastern European Network of Universities;
- member of the European Association of Universities.

=== Study and International Students at Ostroh Academy ===
The National University of Ostroh Academy gives an opportunity for Ukrainian and international students to get an education. Nowadays there are modern educational programs which aim to train a high-class specialist in accordance with the requirements of the time.

In addition, international students have an opportunity to study at the preparatory courses for foreign citizens at Ostroh Academy. This allows them to learn the Ukrainian language, introduce international students to life in Ukraine and to the Ukrainian culture, help to develop the necessary cultural and study skills for effective learning through the medium of Ukrainian/English.

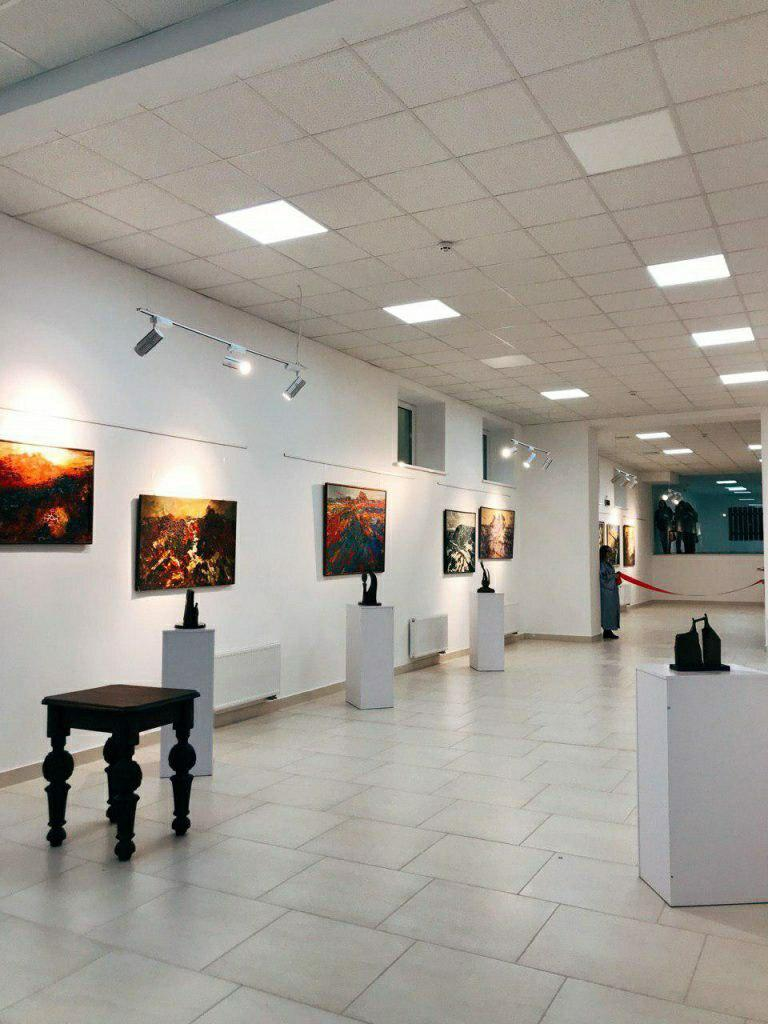
Ostroh Academy ArtCluster

Ostroh Academy is a powerful intellectual platform that opens a number of opportunities for professional and personal development:

- international exchange programs;
- wide selection of certificate programs;
- opportunity to learn 9 foreign languages (English, French, German, Polish, Italian, Spanish, Chinese, Aramaic, Arabic);
- virtual library with access to information resources of the world;
- modern computer classes, lingua-phone rooms;
- about 20 sports clubs;
- student government, interesting and vibrant student life: travel, festivals, international schools, art, psychology, leadership workshops, etc;
- cultural and artistic center;
- proper living conditions in dormitories.

=== Notable Alumni of Ostroh Academy ===
- Jan Latosz — a Polish scholar, astronomer, astrologist and physician; a professor of Ostroh Academy.
- Herasym Smotrycki— the first Rector of Academy, famous Orthodox writer and teacher.
- Cyril Lucaris — a Greek scientist and religious figure, the Rector of Ostroh Academy, the Patriarch of Alexandria, and after that, the Patriarch of Constantinople.
- Meletius Smotrytsky — a noted archbishop and writer from the Polish-Lithuanian Commonwealth, son of the first rector.
- Ivan Vishnevsky — a Ukrainian orthodox monk, religious philosopher and polemist. Closely associated with Ostroh scholars and in particular with Ostroh group of polemicists. In 1598, in Ostroh Book he published an epistle to Vasyl-Kostiantyn Ostrozkyi and Orthodox Christians.
- Severyn Nalyvaiko — the hetman of the Ukrainian Cossacks (a hero of Ukrainian folklore famous by the Nalyvaiko Uprising); lived in Ostroh for years.
- Petro Konashevych-Sahaidachny — the hetman of Ukrainian Cossacks; a graduated of Ostroh Academy and was a school mate of Meletiy Smotrytskyi.
- Iov Boretskyi — the first Rector of Kyiv Brotherhood School, probably graduated the Ostroh Academy.
- Elisei Pletenetsky — a Ukrainian cultural and public figure, educator, writer. Archimandrite of the Kyiv-Pechersk Lavra. Founder of the Lavra printing house and the first paper mill in Central Ukraine.
- Oleksandr Talavera — a Ukrainian economist.
- Valerii Zaluzhnyi — a Ukrainian army general, former commander-in-chief of Ukraine army and currently appointed ambassador of Ukraine to the United Kingdom.

== See also ==
- Ostroh Academy
- List of universities in Ukraine
- Education in Ukraine
