= Ostrog =

Ostrog may refer to:

- Ostrog, Slovenia, a settlement in Šentjernej municipality in Slovenia
- Ostrog monastery, a Serbian Orthodox Christian monastery in Montenegro
- Ostroh, a historic town in Ukraine
- Ostrog (fortress), a Russian term for a small fortress
