= Great Maharsha Synagogue =

Former synagogue in Ostroh, Ukraine

- Hebrew: בית הכנסת המהרש״א
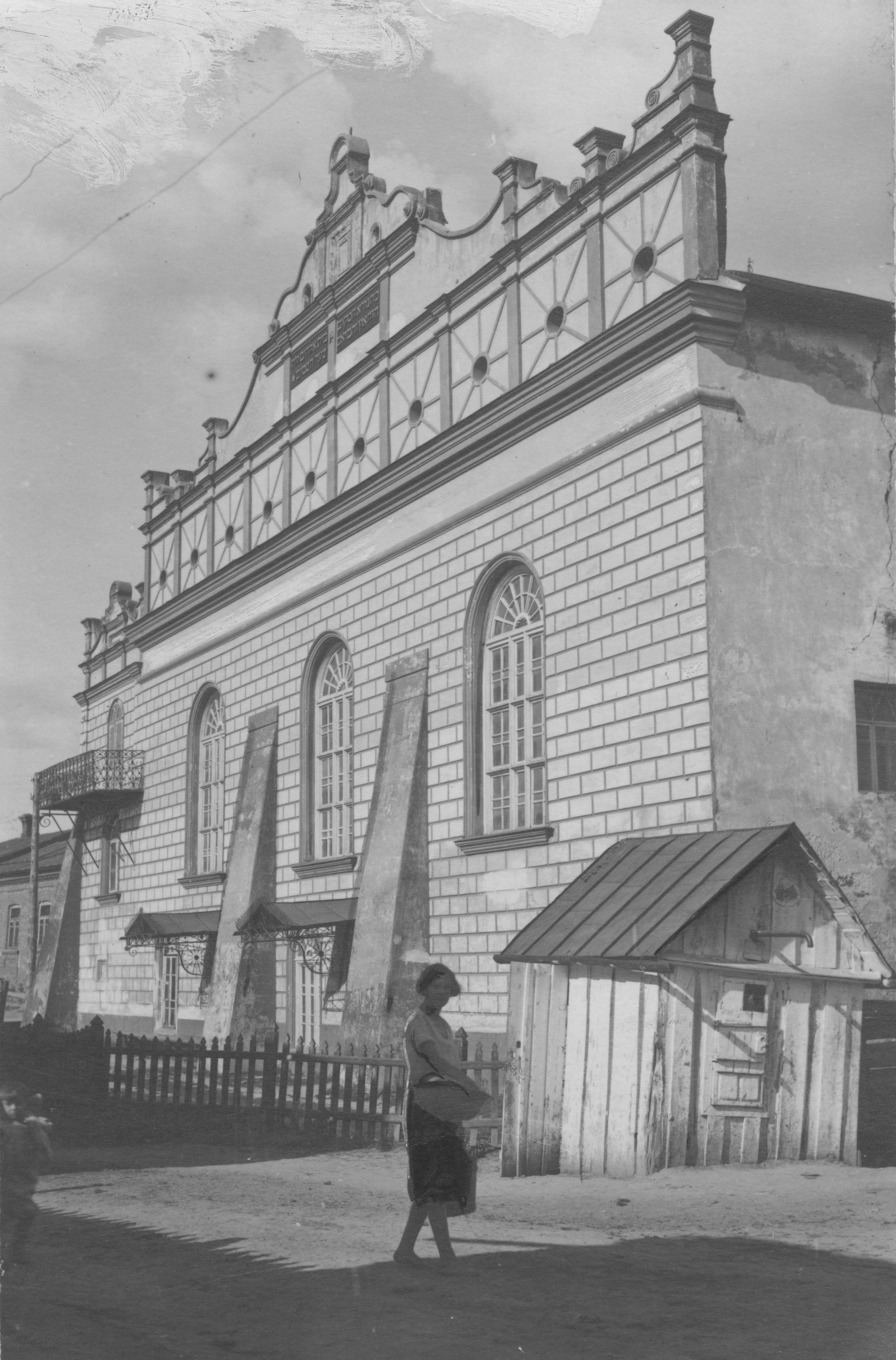
- The former synagogue, in 1933

- Location of the synagogue in Ukraine

Religion
- Affiliation: Judaism (former)
- Rite: Nusach Ashkenaz
- Ecclesiastical or organisational status: Synagogue (1620s–1940s); Warehouse (1960–c. 2000); vacant (since c. 2000)
- Status: Under reconstruction

Location
- Location: Ostroh, Rivne Oblast
- Country: Ukraine
- Coordinates: 50°19′45″N 26°31′11″E

Architecture
- Architects: Giacomo Madlena (Ukrainian: Якопо Мадлена)
- Type: Synagogue architecture
- Style: Baroque
- Established: c. 1550s (as a congregation)
- Completed: c. 1620s

Immovable Monument of Local Significance of Ukraine
- Official name: Синагога (Synagogue)
- Type: Architecture
- Reference no.: 914-Рв

The Great Maharsha Synagogue (Hebrew: בית הכנסת המהרש״א; Ukrainian: Велика синагога, romanized: Velyka synahoha) is a former Jewish synagogue, located in Ostroh, in the Rivne Oblast of Ukraine.

With a congregation established in the1550s, the synagogue was completed in the 1627 in what was, at the time, the Polish—Lithuanian Commonwealth, with the building named in honour of Rabbi Shmuel Eidels. Abandoned in the 1940s, the synagogue was partially destroyed by the Nazis during World War II, and subsequently used by Soviet authorities as a warehouse. Again abandoned, the building fell into disrepair. Restoration efforts commenced in 2016 to preserve the former synagogue as a Jewish history museum.

== History ==
It was built after 1627 under a restriction "prohibiting the erection of synagogues taller than churches." During the Polish–Russian War of 1792, the Russian army under General Kakhovsky (according to Alexander Suvorov, but this is not true) approached Ostroh. The frightened Jews locked themselves in the synagogue to save their lives. Meanwhile, the Polish army left the city, not ready to resist because of its small numbers. The Russians, believing that the synagogue was a castle, shelled the building with cannons for two days.

After explaining to them that the Poles had long since left the city, he showed the Russians the ford across the Vilia River (the bridge was burned by the Poles during their retreat). Later, as a sign of this miraculous rescue, the place on the south wall where the cannonball hit was not plastered, and the other cannonball was hung under the vault in the prayer hall.

In 1912, the building was overhauled. The western façade was decorated with rusticated wood. The attic of the northern extension was remodeled. The interior was painted. As a result of the fighting during World War II, the building was heavily damaged. In 1941, it was destroyed and looted by the Nazi occupiers. The loopholes on the main façade and the buttresses between the windows were completely destroyed.

In 1960, the building suffered significant losses and was turned into a warehouse. The eastern part was destroyed, as well as most of the northern part and the attic of the western façade. Only the prayer hall has survived, redesigned on three floors (the interfloor ceilings were removed in 2002).

The synagogue was damaged during the Khmelnytsky massacres and centuries later, once again, during the Holocaust. It was used as a warehouse during the Soviet era, and later abandoned. Reconstruction of the ruins began in 2016 under the leadership of Hryhoriy Arshynov; who died suddenly in 2020. It was proposed that this site be restored as a Jewish history museum.

== Gallery ==
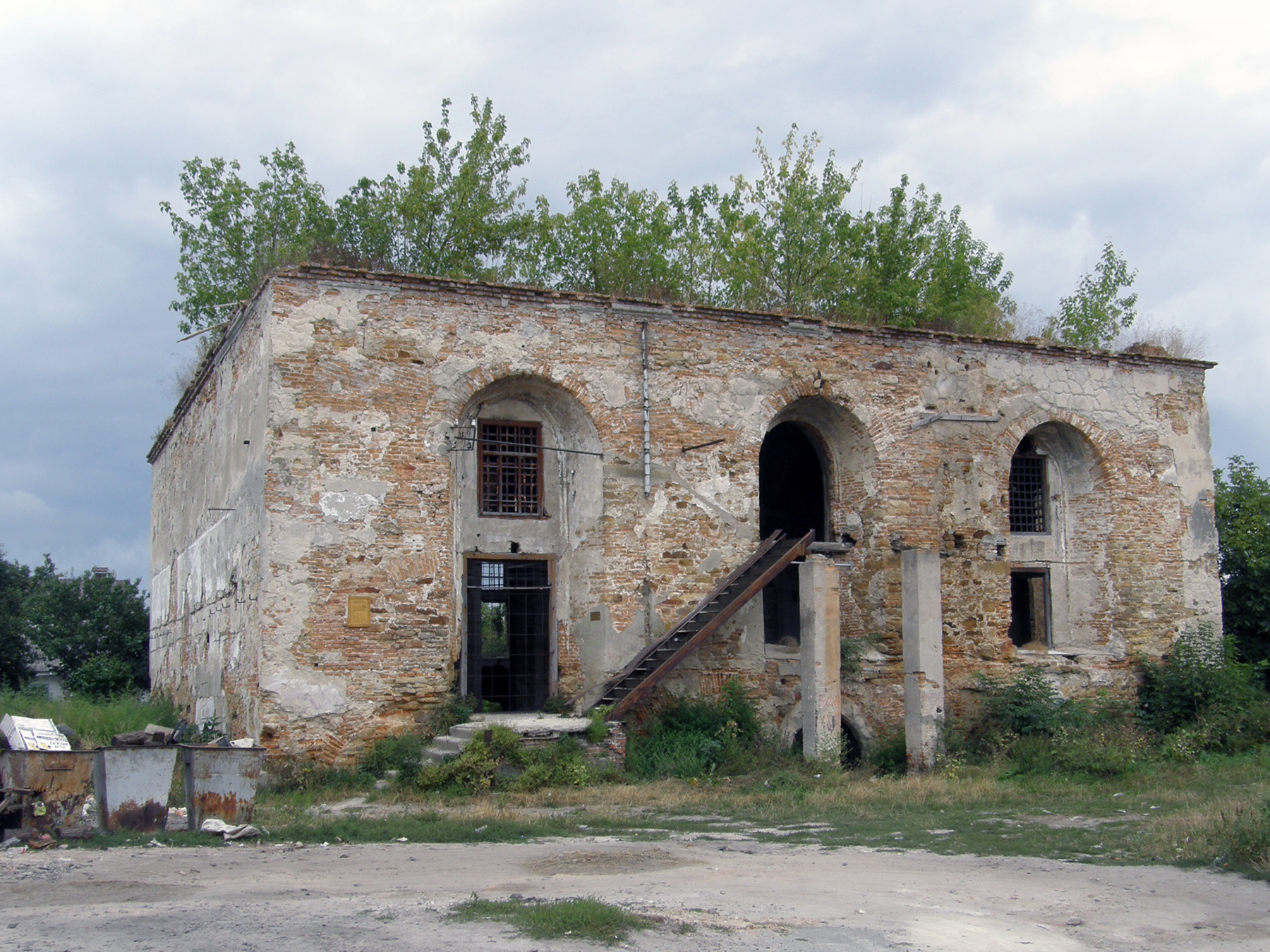
Exterior before the restoration

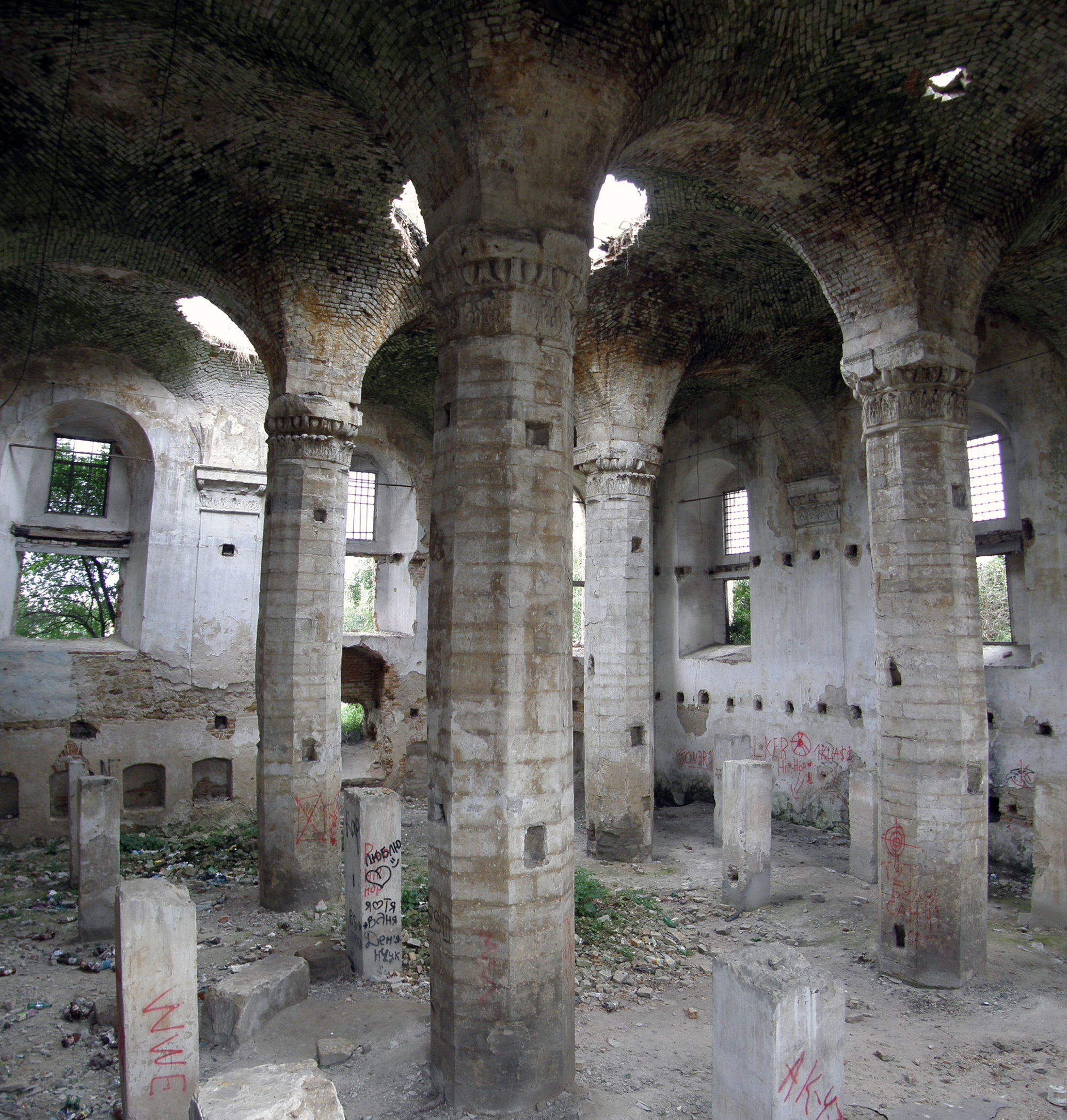
Interior before the restoration

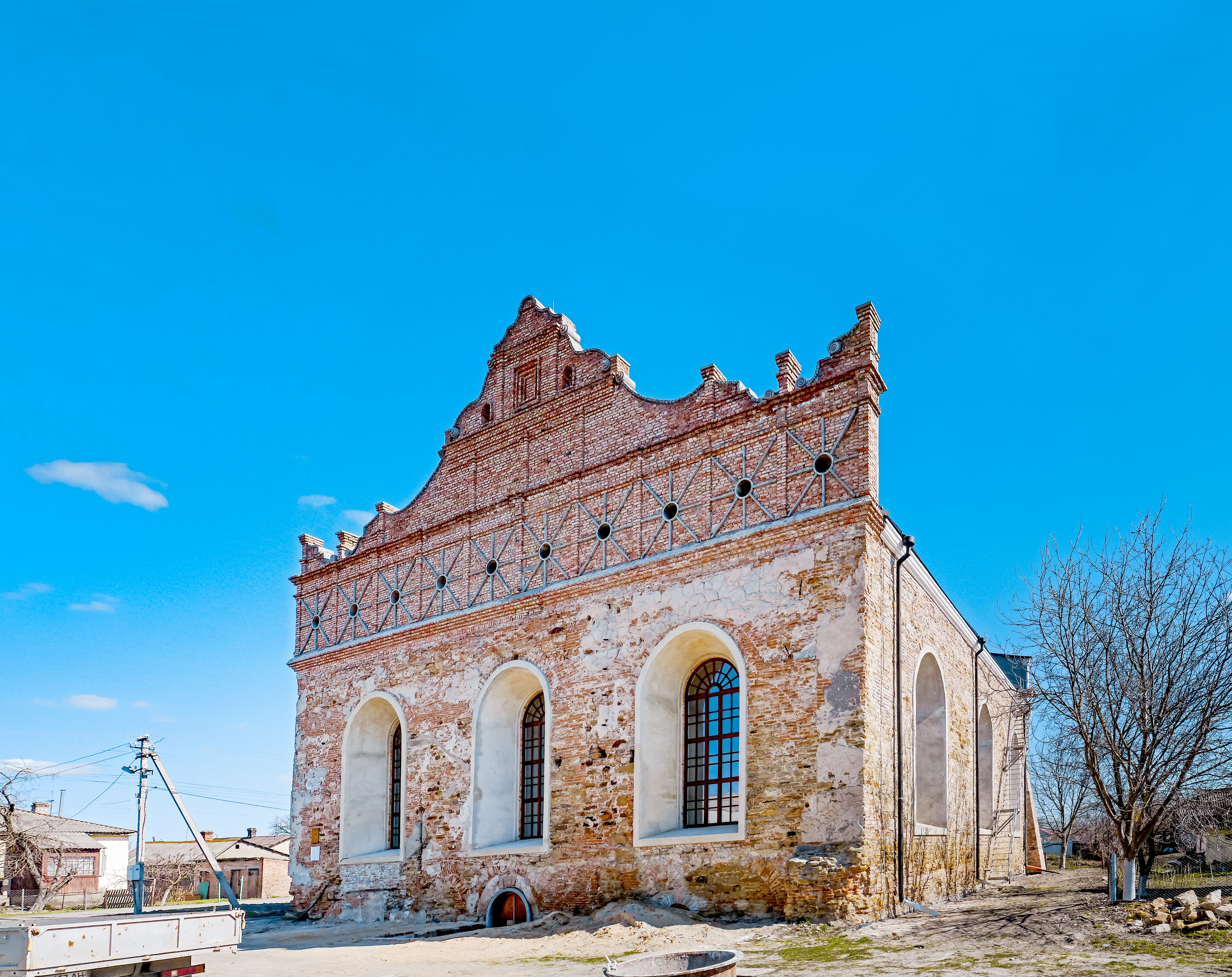
The partially restored synagogue as of 2020

== See also ==
- History of the Jews in Ukraine
- List of synagogues in Ukraine
