= Jan Latosz =

Jan Latosz or Jan Latoszyński (1539–1608) was a Polish scholar, astronomer, astrologist and physician. A professor at the Cracow Academy, he is best known for his staunch criticism of the papal calendar reform, for which he was deposed of his post. He fled to Ostróg, where he became the personal physician to Prince Konstanty Wasyl Ostrogski and a professor at the Ostrog Academy.

== Biography ==
Born in or around 1539, Latosz entered the Cracow Academy some time in mid-16th century. Initially he had trouble achieving the degree of magister, the fact which some authors attribute to his personal animosities. Eventually however he became the member of the academy and rose to prominence, eventually owning a large tenement house at Szewska Street, half of the profit from which he spent for charity.

As an astronomer, Latosz was a follower of Copernicus. He published numerous works mostly based on Copernican theory, most of which either did not survive to our time or are known only from single copies held in Jagiellonian University's library. Among them were a treatise Poprawa kalenarza (now lost, possibly written in Latin), as well as Kometa (Comet, published in 1596) and De mutationibus regnorum tum observationibus quoque in ecclipses atque Cometas aliquot. Most of those were already considered lost by 1814. Latosz was also an astrologist, trying to use Copernican theory to predict future (including the end of the world) in a book titled Prognosticon.

=== Calendar reform ===
Latosz was one of the people tasked with commenting Pope Gregory XIII's Gregorian calendar reform when it was proposed to all major European universities in 1581. While most of the academy approved of the reform plan, Latosz presented a different solution through his old acquaintance Alberto Cardinal Bolognetti, former Papal nuncio to Poland in the times of king Stephen Bathory. His design was declared incompatible with the rulings of ecumenical councils and instead the pope adopted a different solution to the leap year problem.

This sparked a series of events as Latosz believed his solution was much more complete and astronomically correct than the solution adopted by all Catholic states of Europe. At the same time Protestant states criticised the calendar reform, mostly because it was proposed by papacy rather than the Holy Roman Emperor or any other lay authority. Because of that Latosz was associated with Protestants in a country ruled by ultra-Catholic monarch Sigismund III Vasa. In addition to that, the calendar question in the Polish–Lithuanian Commonwealth became strongly linked to the struggle between Catholic, Uniate and Orthodox magnates, the latter arguing against the reform for reasons of tradition.

Latosz argued in numerous pamphlets and books that the Catholic church in its new calendar missed a couple of minutes every year, which made the new calendar worse instead of improving it. Fearing reprisals against the academy, under insistence of the bishop of Cracow Bernard Maciejowski, the rector deposed Latosz of his post.

=== Later life ===
Latosz moved to Ostrog, where he became the personal physician to Prince Konstanty Wasyl Ostrogski, one of the most influential people in eastern Poland of the time. He died and was buried in Ostrog in 1608. His grave at the local cemetery was destroyed by Soviet authorities in 1960.
