= Katarzyna Telniczanka =

Polish noble (1480–1528)

Katarzyna Telniczanka (1480–1528), was a Polish noble. She was the royal mistress of king Sigismund I the Old, and the mother of three children by the monarch.

== Life ==
Katarzyna, who was reputedly not of noble birth, may have taken her surname from her place of origin - the village of Ternice in Moravia. However, her original family name may have been Ochstat. She became the mistress of the king c. 1498.

She was the mother of John of the Lithuanian Dukes, future bishop of Poznań (8 January 1499 – 18 February 1538), Regina (1500/1 – 20 May 1526), wed c. 20 October 1518 Hieronim Szafraniec, Starost of Cieszyn (d. 1556/59), and Katarzyna (1503 – before 9 September 1548), wed after 1522 George II Count von Montfort in Pfannberg (d. 1544).

In 1509, she married the nobleman Andrzej Kościelecki. She had one child while married, Beata Łaska z Kościeleckich, who was reputed to be the child of the Sigismund as well.

She followed her son John to his position in Lithuania, where she had great influence in his court.

== Sources ==
- Wdowiszewski Z., Genealogia Jagiellonów i Domu Wazów w Polsce, Kraków 2005, pp. 182–186.
