= The Witch of Konotop (play) =

The Witch of Konotop (Ukrainian: Конотопська відьма, romanized: Konotopska vidma) is a Ukrainian play based on the novel of the same name. It premiered at the Ivan Franko Theater in Kyiv in early 2023 under the direction of Ivan Uryvskyi.

== Premise ==
In 17th-century Konotop, Ukraine, Cossack military leader Zabryokha attempts to avoid going to war against the Russian Empire while trying to vanquish the witches which he believes are getting in his way of love. A witch hunt unfolds following a drought in the town.

== Cast ==
Role	2024 production
Zabroykha	Nazar Zadniprovskyi
Olena	Mariia Rudynska
Pistryak	Mykhailo Kukuyuk

== Reception ==
The play was well received following its premiere in spring 2023, and had become popular by fall 2023. Performances have been consistently sold out up to a year in advance. During a charity performance in December 2023, the theater raised UAH 1.7 million for the Ukrainian Armed Forces; during a second charity performance in March 2024, the theater raised UAH ₴2.3 million. In August 2024, part of the play was shown at the Global Peace Summit in Switzerland.

The production won the Taras Shevchenko National Prize in the category of theatrical art. The play also gained exposure on TikTok, with several clips going viral.
