= Ostroh Academy =

16th-century education institution in Ostroh, Polish-Lithuanian Commonwealth

Ostroh University
- Active: 1576–1636
- Location: Ostroh, Polish–Lithuanian Commonwealth (modern Ukraine)

The Ostroh Academy (Polish: Akademia Ostrogska; Ukrainian: Острозька академія, romanized: Ostroz'ka academiya) was an influential institute of higher learning located in Ostroh in the Polish–Lithuanian Commonwealth. It is considered the first institution of higher education in the Eastern Slavic world, dating to 1576 and founded by the wealthy Ruthenian magnate Konstanty Wasyl Ostrogski. The academy was at the centre of what historians have dubbed the "Ostroh Renaissance", an Orthodox cultural revival led by the Rus’ magnates of Poland-Lithuania in resistance to the dominant Reformation and Counter-Reformation.

Its crowning achievement was the publication of the Ostroh Bible in 1581, the first complete print of the Bible in a Slavic language, and an "epochal event in the life of the whole Orthodox world."

== History ==
In the late 16th century, all higher schools of the Polish–Lithuanian Commonwealth were under influence of Catholic or Protestant nobles. The Council of Trent (1545–63) and the activities of the Jesuits, under the guardianship of Sigismund III, upset the delicate religious balance between Catholics and Protestants. These changes marked the beginning in earnest of the Counter-Reformation.

It was in this context, that an Orthodox revival began amongst the Ruthenians in Poland–Lithuania. The Protestant Reformation had introduced to the Ruthenian Orthodox faithful the desirability of delivering the Gospel to ordinary people in the language they understood, so in 1561, the handwritten Peresopnytsia Gospel appeared – the first translation of the New Testament from Church Slavonic into the vernacular Ruthenian language. This is in fact the Bible on which modern Ukrainian presidents take their oath of office.

To counter specifically the influence of the proliferation of Jesuit schools, the Ruthenian Count Konstanty Ostrogski, one of the most powerful people in the Crown of Poland (and later a major partisan of the Orthodox faith against the Union of Brest), founded a large school in his estate in Ostroh. Ostrogski envisioned a lay school, that would however strengthen the Eastern Christian spirit in the country and prevent conversions to Protestantism and Catholicism, a process in full swing at the time and as such was first mentioned in Piotr Skarga's 1577 On the Unity of God's Church under the Single Shepherd and on Greek Secession from this Unity.

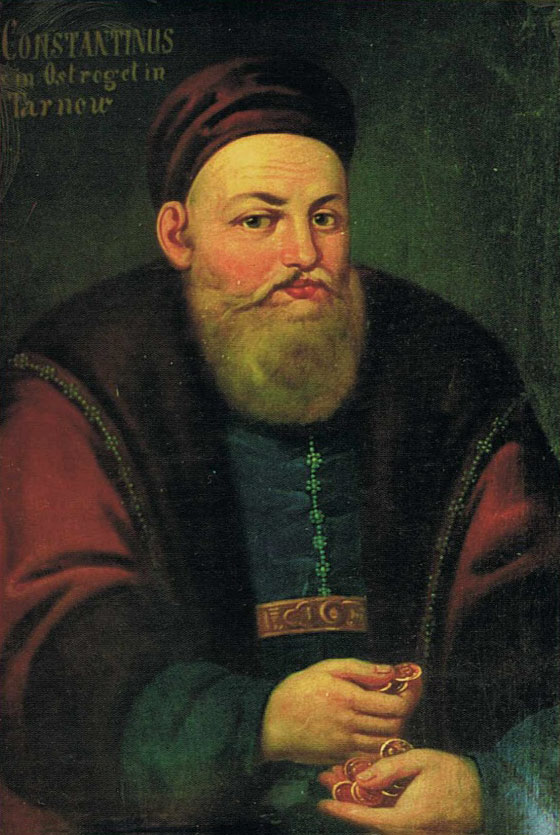
Konstanty Wasyl Ostrogski

The school was founded sometime between 1576 and 1580, but it did not start full activities until 1585. Initially tasked only with translation of The Bible to Old Church Slavonic (later published as the Ostroh Bible), with time it grew to become a permanent institution of secondary education. A large part of the funding came from Princess Halszka Ostrogska's testament of 1579, in which she donated "six times sixty thousand" (360,000) Lithuanian grosz to local school, hospital and Holy Spas' (i.e. Savior's) monastery near Łuck (Lutsk).

== Curriculum and activities ==
The school, officially styled as an Academy, was modelled after Western European education of the epoch. The curriculum matched that of the best Jesuit schools, and it attracted the most talented Ukrainian pupils, such as Meletii Smotrytsky. It taught the trivium (grammar, rhetorics, dialectics) as well as the quadrivium (arithmetics, geometry, music and astronomy). It featured education in Latin, Greek and Ruthenian (predecessor to both modern Ukrainian and Belarusian), the only institution of higher education in the world teaching that language at the time.

The first rector of the academy was Herasym Smotrytskyi, a noted Eastern Christian writer of the epoch. With time, Ostrogski assembled a significant group of professors, many of them having been expelled from the Jagiellonian University (such as the first dean of astronomy Jan Latosz) or having quarreled with the king or the Catholic clergy. However, the political nature of the conflict between Ostrogski, Protestants and Catholics prevented the school from attracting enough professors of international fame. It did however invite numerous Greek scientists from abroad, including Smotrytskyi's successor Kyrillos Lukaris, as well as Metropolitan bishop Kizikos, Nicefor Parasios, the envoy of the Metropolitan of Constantinople, and Emmanuel Achilleos, a religious writer. Some of the professors were also of local stock, including Jurij Rohatyniec, Wasyl Maluszycki and Jow Kniahicki. The religious character of the academy was underlined by close ties to Eastern Christian monasteries of Derman, Dubno, Slutsk and later also Pochayiv.

While the school failed to attract as many students as the founder had envisioned, it nevertheless became very influential as a centre of Ruthenian (that is Ukrainian and Belarusian) culture and literature. Among the notable alumni were religious writer Zacharius Kopystensky, hetman Petro Konashevych-Sahaidachny, one of the fathers of Belarusian poetry Andrzej Rymsza and future exarchs of Lviv, Gedeon Balaban, and of Polotsk, Meletius Smotrytsky, son of the first rector and a noted Orthodox writer and teacher. It also became the alma mater of professors of the so-called Brotherhood schools for Orthodox burghers being founded in the late 16th century all around the country in accordance with the royal decree of 1585 by king Stefan Bathory.

== The Ostroh Bible ==
The importance of the first printed Cyrillic Bible in 1581 can hardly be overestimated. A monumental and lavishly decorated publication, the Ostroh Bible was widely known in Ukraine, Russia, and Belarus, and copies were sent abroad to Pope Gregory XIII, Oxford University, Tsar Ivan the Terrible, King Gustavus Adolphus of Sweden, Cardinal Barberini, and many more contemporary scholars and public figures.

The Bible best represented Ostrozkyi’s efforts to "turn a reformed Orthodoxy into the political equivalent of the Calvinism professed by his Polish and Lithuanian colleagues." The Polish administrators at the time were engaged in a "multifaceted and all-encompassing" policy of Polonization and conversion to Catholicism, and what's more, the Jesuits insisted on only the use of the Latin or Greek languages for scripture and academic publications. The publishing of this Ostroh Bible in Church Slavonic, provided an entirely new impetus for Orthodox scholarship and learning.

== Closure ==
The college was closed in 1636, not long after Ostrozkyi's "fanatically Catholic" granddaughter transformed it into a Jesuit College. The closure of the academy was connected with the Catholicization of the descendants Konstanty Wasyl Ostrogski and the activities of the Jesuits. The academy was liquidated by the old prince's granddaughter, Nadia's daughter and Oleksander Ostrogski — Anna Alojza Ostrogska, who was married to Jan Karol Chodkiewicz). She materially limited the activity of the academy, trying to reduce it to the level of a parochial school, and created instead a Jesuit college in Ostroh (1624). On Easter night of 1636, Anna Alojza managed to finally liquidate the remnants of the academy and introduce the union in Ostroh and other estates - provoking a demonstration by the pupils.

== Legacy ==
On April 12, 1994, President of Ukraine Leonid Kravchuk issued a decree On Establishing Ostroh Higher Collegium, and the National University of Ostroh Academy was founded 358 years after the demise of the original.

== Notable dates ==
- June 18, 1578 – Ivan Fyodorov with help of teachers printed first book in Ukraine - Bukvar (Alphabet) and “Greek-Rus' Church Slavonic Reader”, which mentions the establishment of the Ostroh Academy.
- March 9, 1579 – niece of duke Konstanty Ostrogski – princess Halszka Ostrogska confirms in testament her contribution for St. Spas Monastery, village Dorosyni and Ostroh Academy of amount of 6 000 "cop money" in Lithuanian count. This was first contribution for Academy.
- 1580 – with assistance of teachers Ivan Fyodorov printed first in Ukraine printed “Book of New Testament”, Tymophy Mykhailovych's “Книжка събраніе вещей нужнеѣйших вкъратцѣ скораго ради обрѣтенія в Книзе Новаго Завѣта” and first edition of science literature.
- May 5, 1581 – was printed first religious poetic calendar “Которого ся мѣсяца што за старых вѣков дѣло коротко е описаніе”, known in modern science literature as Andrew Rymshi's “Chronology”.
- July 12, 1581 – was printed "Ostroh Bible", with effort of Ivan Fyodorov and leaders of academy this was first full printing of Eastern Orthodox's Old Testament.

== Notable alumni ==
- Petro Konashevych-Sahaidachny (1570 - March 20, 1622) — Ukrainian noble, Hetman of Ukraine (1614 – 1622).
- Ostroh Сleric — pseudonym of Ukrainian unknown writer-polemnist (end of 16th - beginning of 17th century).
- Meletius Smotrytsky (1577 - December 17(27), 1633) — Ukrainian linguist from Galicia, author and religious activist.
- Andrew Rymsha — Ukrainian writer and translator at the end of 16th century.

== See also ==
- National University of Ostroh Academy
- National University of Kyiv-Mohyla Academy
- Ostroh Bible
- Education in Ukraine
