= Andrzej Kościelecki =

Polish noble (1455–1515)

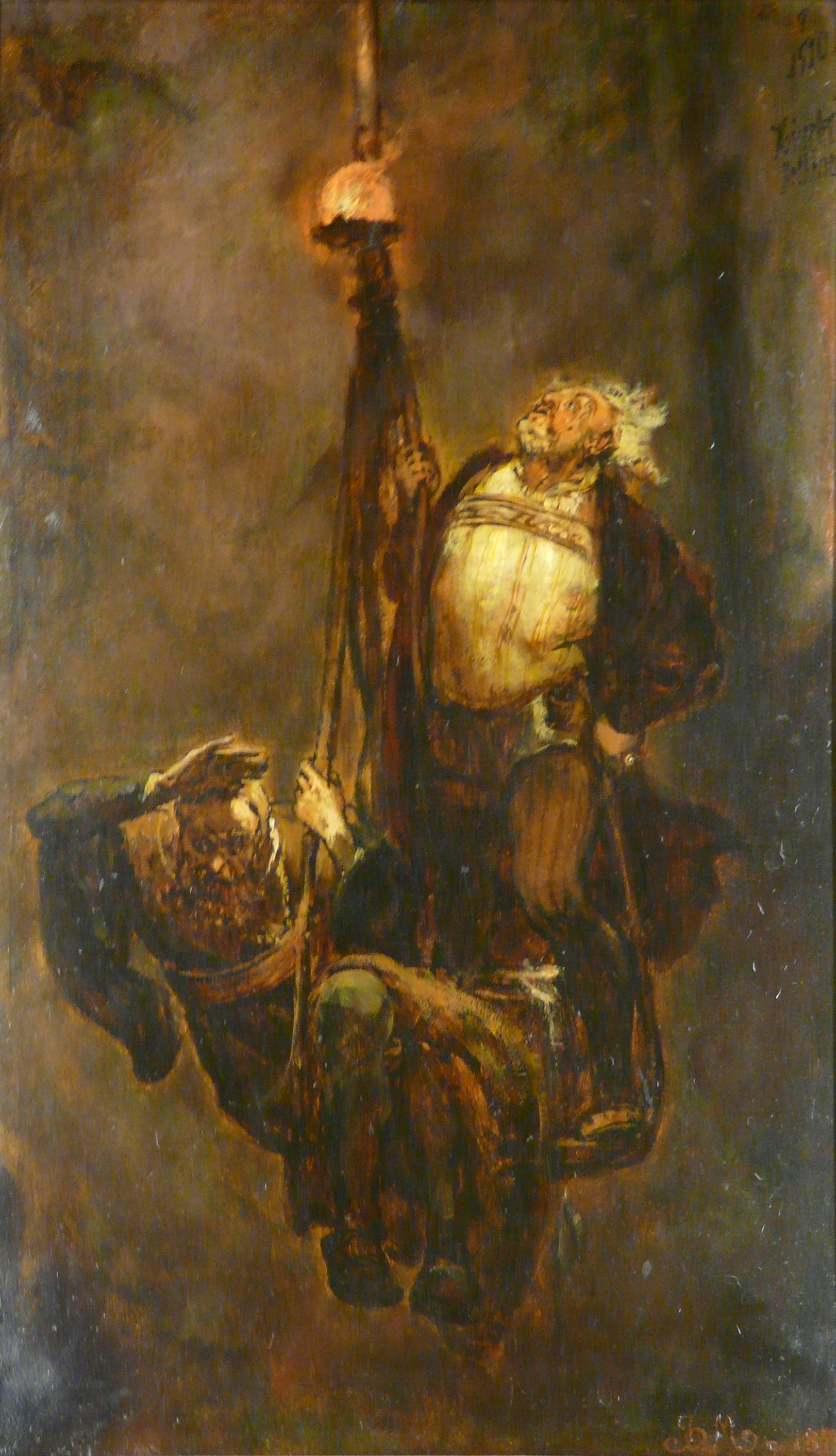
Descent of Andrzej Kościelecki and Seweryn Bethman to the Wieliczka mine during the fire. Painting by Jan Matejko.

Andrzej Jędrzej Kościelecki (1455–1515) was a Polish noble who served as Marshal of the household of Cardinal Fryderyk Jagiellończyk, starosta of Bydgoszcz from 1485, starosta of Świecie from 1487, Marshal of the Court from 1501, starosta of Spiš from 1507, Castellan of Wiślica and Biecz from 1508, Żupnik of Wieliczka–Bochnia from 1508, Podskarbi from 1509, starosta of Oświęcim from 1509, starosta of Inowrocław from 1510, starosta of Nowy Sącz from 1512, starosta of Zator from 1513, Castellan of Wojnicz from 1513, Gran Steward and the burgrave of Kraków. He was born in Kościelec.

He is one of the characters on the famous painting by Jan Matejko, Prussian Homage.
