= Ostroh =

City in Rivne Oblast, Ukraine

Ostroh Острог
- City
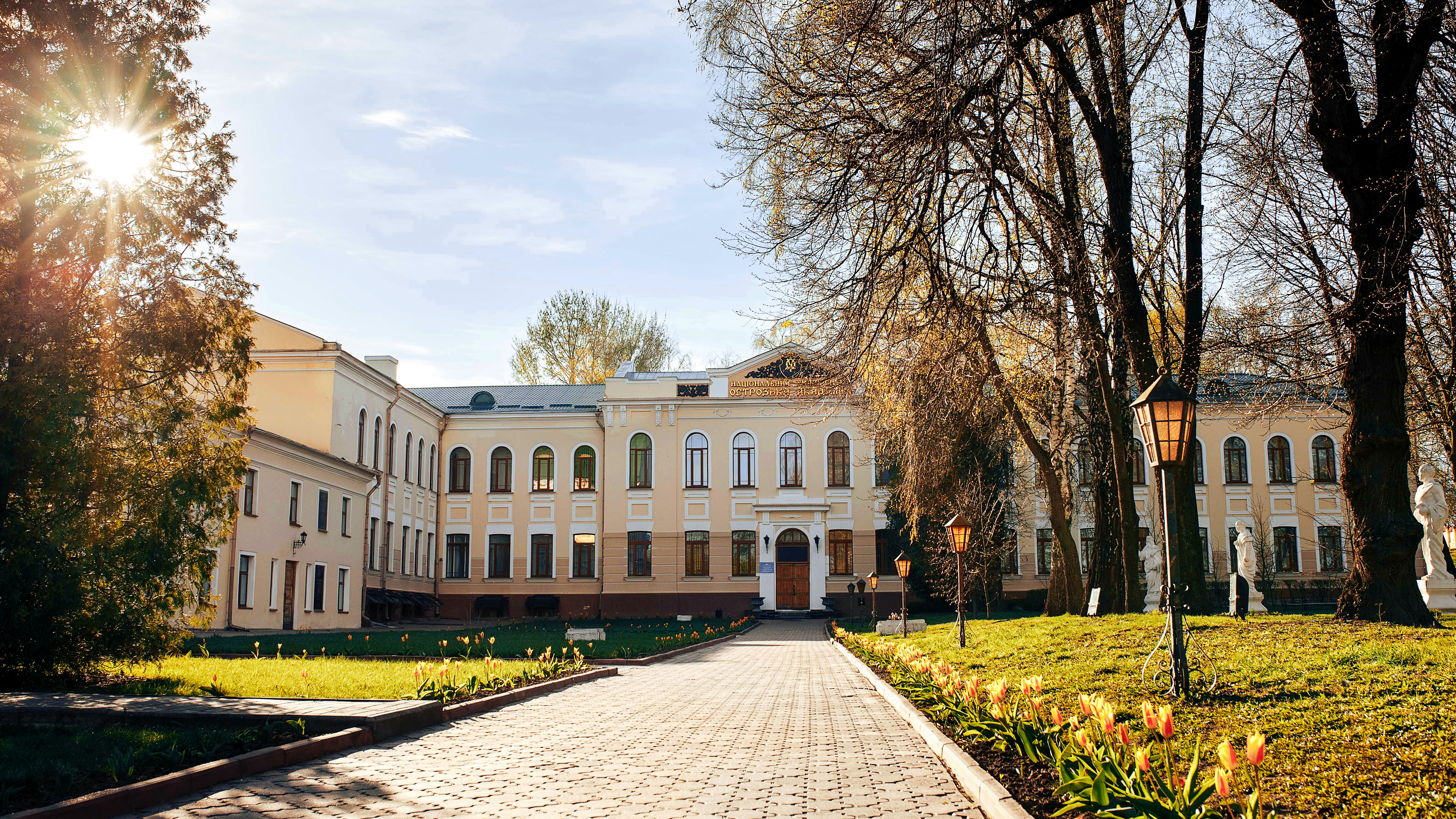
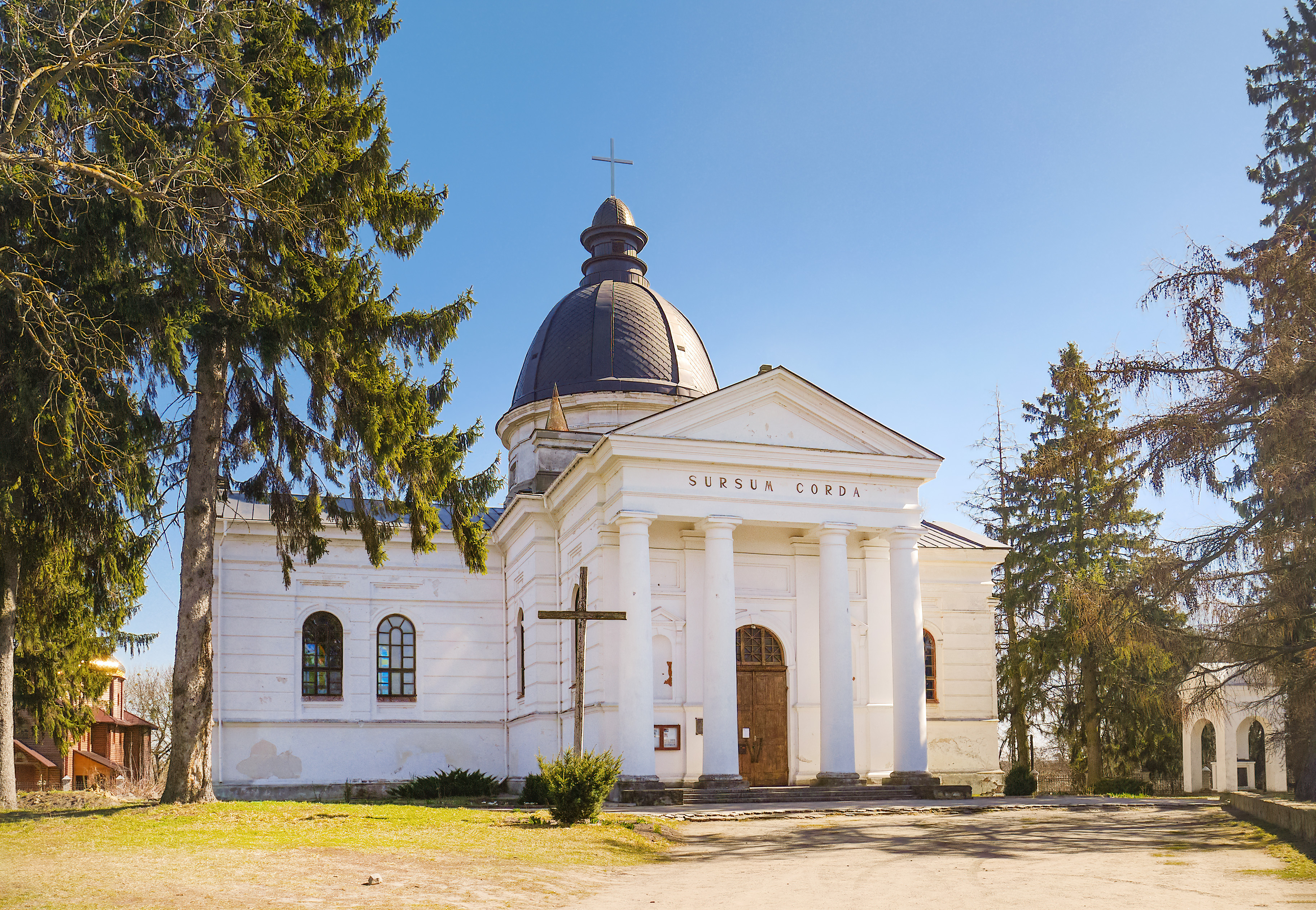
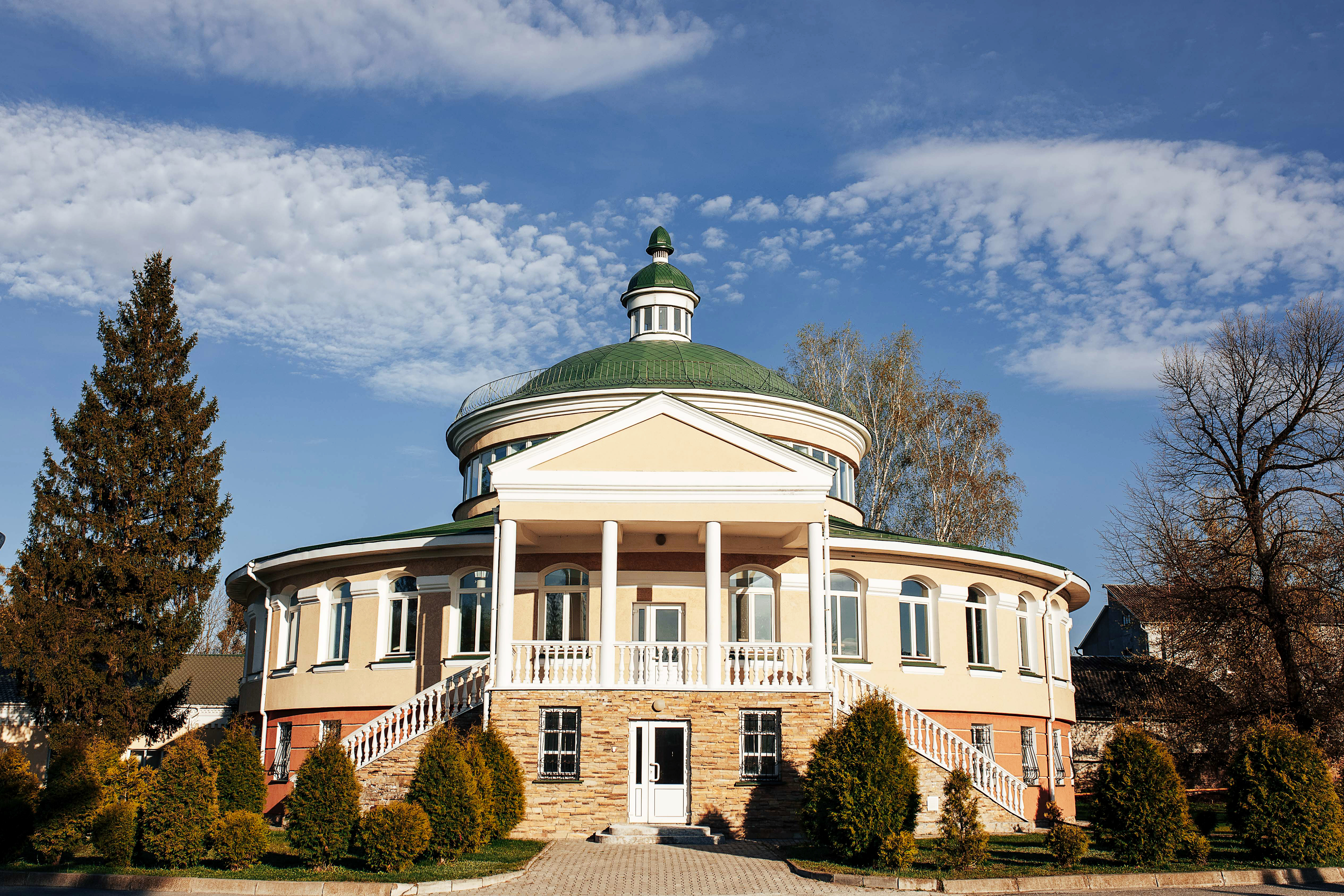
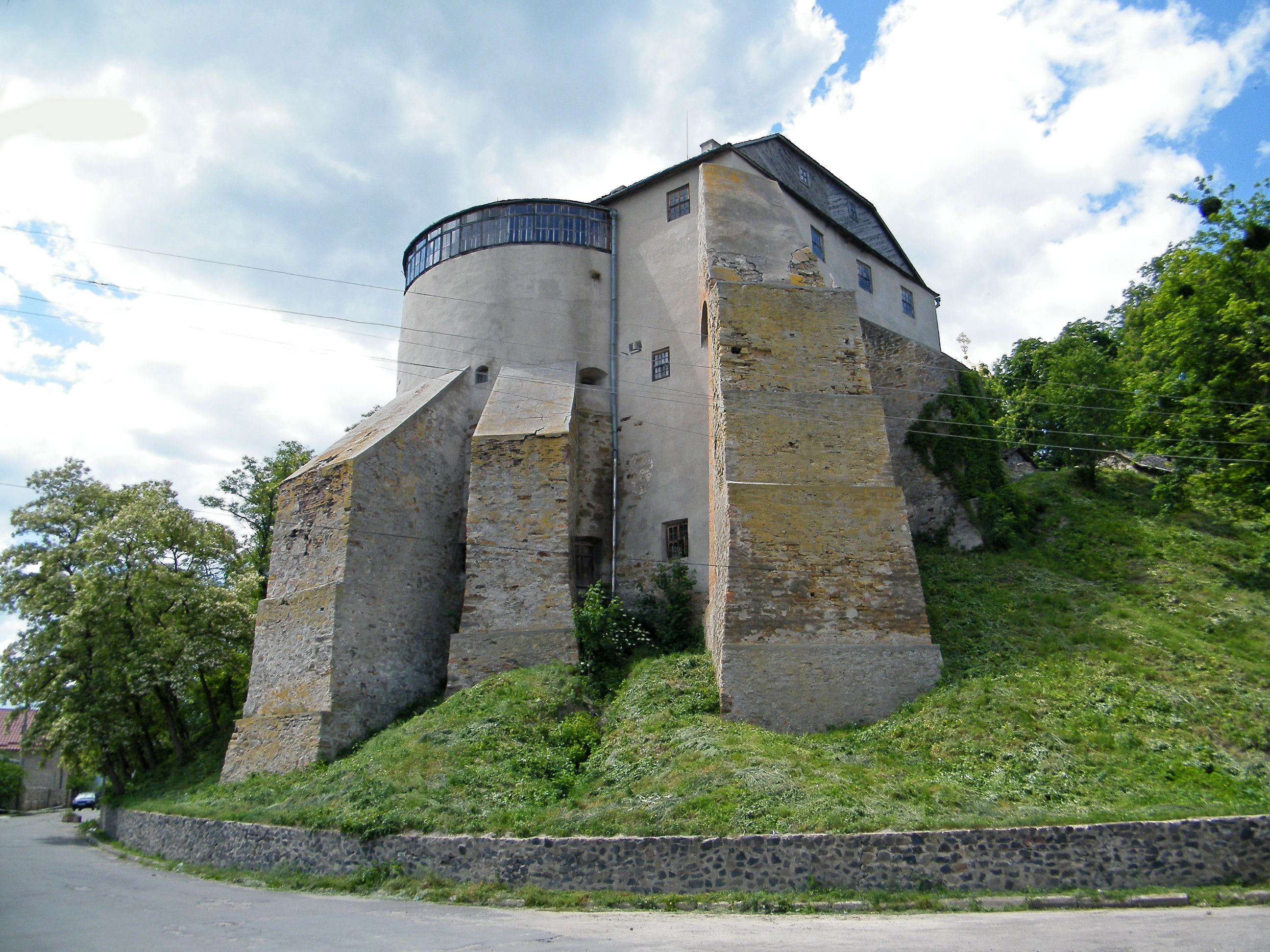
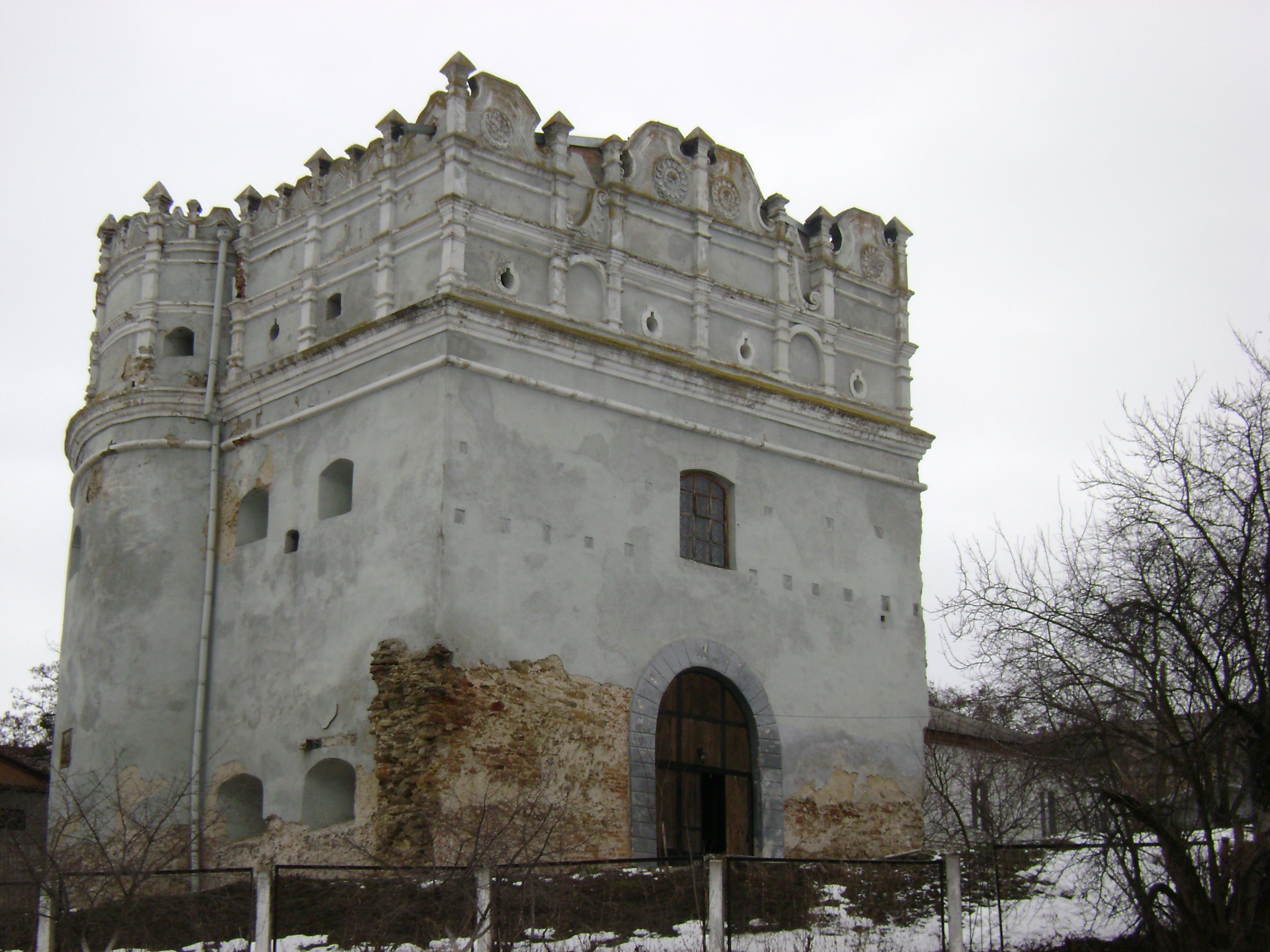
- Clockwise from top: Old Campus of the Ostroh Academy; Scientific Library of the Academy; Lutsk Gate Tower; Guard Tower of the Ostroh Castle; Church of the Dormition of the Virgin Mary

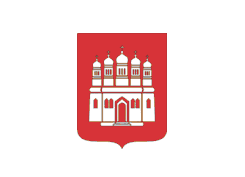
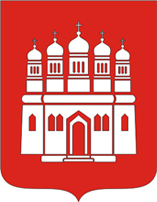
- Flag Coat of arms

- Location within Rivne Oblast Location within Ukraine
- Coordinates: 50°20′0″N 26°31′0″E
- Country: Ukraine
- Oblast: Rivne Oblast
- Raion: Rivne Raion
- Hromada: Ostroh urban hromada
- First mentioned: 1100
- City rights: 1795

Government
  - Mayor: Yuri Yahodka

Area
  - Total: 10.9 km^{2} (4.2 sq mi)

Population (2001 census)
  - Total: 14,801
  - Density: 1,358/km^{2} (3,520/sq mi)
- Time zone: UTC+2 (EET)
  - Summer (DST): UTC+3 (EEST)
- Postal code: 35800—35807
- Area code: +380 3654
- Sister cities: (Poland) Gniew, Sandomierz, Bieruń, (Czech Republic) Beroun, (United States) Beaufort, South Carolina, Athens, Ohio, (Italy) Torre del Greco
- Website: https://ostroh-rada.gov.ua/

Ostroh (Ukrainian: Острог [oˈstrɔɦ], Polish: Ostróg) is a city in Rivne Oblast, western Ukraine. It is situated on the Horyn River. Ostroh was the administrative center of Ostroh Raion until 2020, but as a city of oblast significance did not belong to the raion. Currently the city is the centre of Ostroh urban hromada. Population: 14,894 (2022 estimate).

The Ostroh Academy was established here in 1576, the first higher educational institution in modern Ukraine. Furthermore, in the 16th century, the first East Slavic books, notably the Ostrog Bible, were printed there.

== History ==
=== Medieval times to the Polish partitions ===
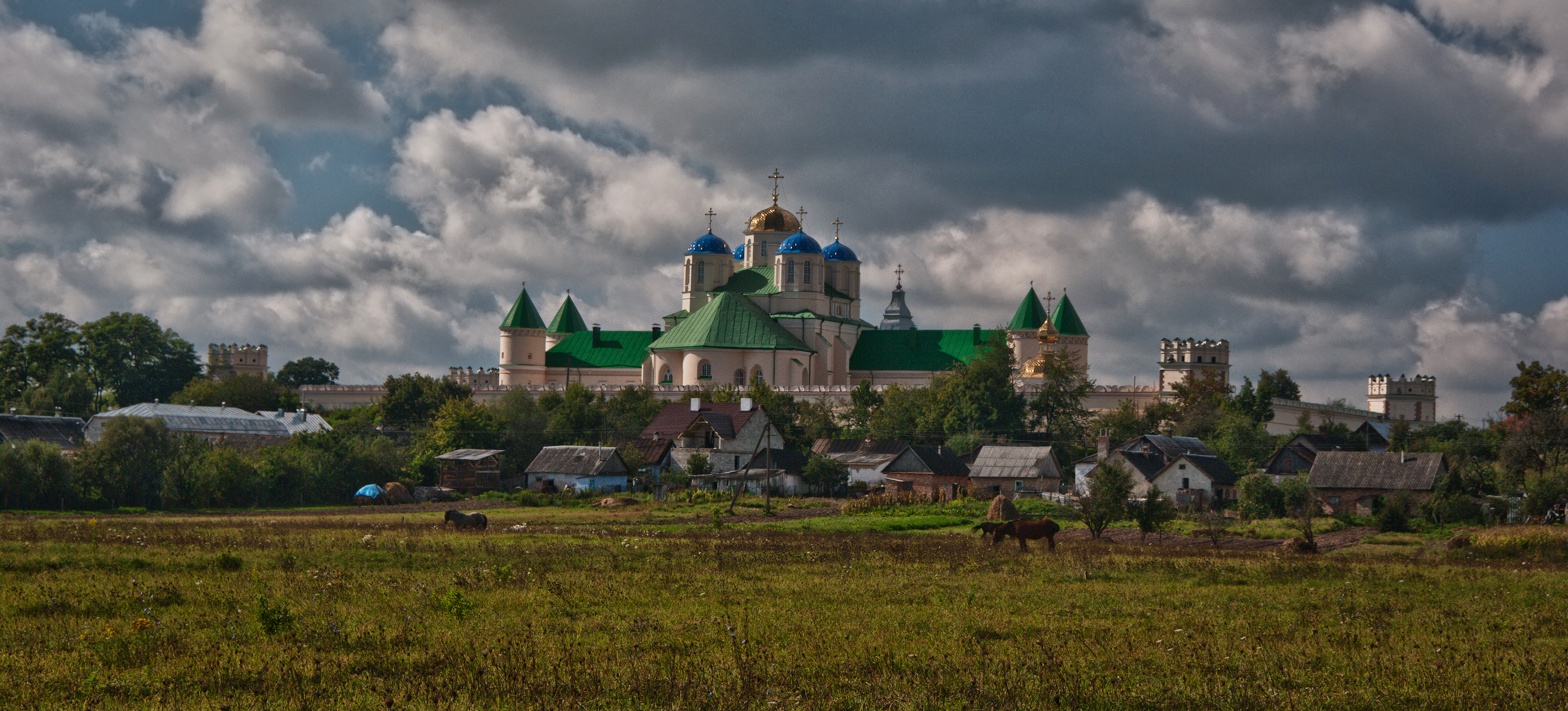
The Mezhyrich Monastery

The Hypatian Codex first mentions Ostroh in 1100, as a fortress of the Volhynian princes. Since the 14th century, it was the seat of the powerful Ostrogski princely family, who developed their town into a great centre of learning and commerce. Upon the family's demise in the 17th century, Ostroh passed to the Zasławski and then Lubomirski families.

In the second half of the 14th century, Ostroh, together with the whole of Volhynia, was administratively integrated into the Grand Duchy of Lithuania. Following the Union of Lublin (1569), the town became part of the Kingdom of Poland. Administratively it was located in the Volhynian Voivodeship in the Lesser Poland Province. Ostroh, known in Polish as Ostróg, received Magdeburg rights in 1585. In the 17th century, the town was surrounded by fortifications, with a moat, a rampart with five bastions. In 1609–1753, it was the capital of the Ostrogski family fee tail, founded by Voivode Janusz Ostrogski, who invited Bernardine monks to Ostróg. Furthermore, the town had a Calvinist academy; among its lecturers was Andrzej Wegierski.

During the Khmelnytsky Uprising, the town was sacked and torched by the Cossacks. The Great Maharsha Synagogue, built in 1627, was damaged during this period. Ostróg slowly recovered, and in the second half of the 18th century, it became the site of a Jesuit college (see Collegium Nobilium).

=== The Russian Empire through World War II ===
In the Second Partition of Poland in 1793, the town was forcibly annexed by the Russian Empire, where it remained until 1918. Railroad lines, built in the 19th century, missed Ostróg, and as a result, the town stagnated. The railway station serving the area was built in 1873, 14 km (8.7 mi) away, in the village of Ożenin.

Historical population
Year	Pop.	±%
1921	12,975	—
1931	12,955	−0.2%
2022	14,894	+15.0%

In the interwar period, Ostróg belonged to the County of Zdołbunów, Volhynian Voivodeship of the Second Polish Republic. It was an important garrison town for the Polish Army, and the Border Protection Corps (KOP). The KOP Battalion "Ostróg" was stationed there, along with the 19th Volhynian Uhlan Regiment. On July 7, 1920, during the Polish–Soviet War, it was the site of a battle between a Polish unit under Wincenty Krajowski, and the Bolsheviks of Semyon Budyonny's 1st Cavalry Army. Throughout 1919–1939 Ostróg was located in close to the Polish–Soviet border, and special passes were required to enter some districts of the town.

Following the 1939 Soviet invasion of Poland, Ostróg was annexed by the Soviet Union, as part of the Ukrainian Soviet Socialist Republic. An unknown number of the town's residents were forcibly sent to Siberia. Local mayor Stanisław Ludwik Żurakowski was arrested by the Soviets, then held in several prisons in Volhynia, and eventually deported to Kozelsk and murdered in the Katyn massacre in April 1940.

The Nazi German occupation resulted in the establishment of the Reichskommissariat Ukraine (RKU), with headquarters in Rivne. In the autumn of 1941 several large-scale mass murders took place in Volhynia. On 1 September 1941 2,500 Jews were shot in Ostróg. Six weeks later, the ghetto was disbanded and another 3,000 people were killed in the Holocaust.

=== Modern times ===
In 2022, an informal sister city arrangement was established with Beaufort, South Carolina in the United States in which the residents of Beaufort raised funds to support Ostroh during the Russian invasion of Ukraine.

Landmarks include Ostroh Castle on the Red Hill, with the church of the Epiphany (built in the fifteenth century) and several towers (Tatar Gate Tower and Roun "New" Tower). To the north-west from the castle stand two sixteenth-century towers. The suburb of Mezhirichi contains the Abbey of the Trinity, with a fifteenth-century cathedral and other ancient buildings.

== Notable residents ==
- Tetiana Ovsiichuk (born 1995), Ukrainian production designer

== Gallery ==
Ostroh landmarks

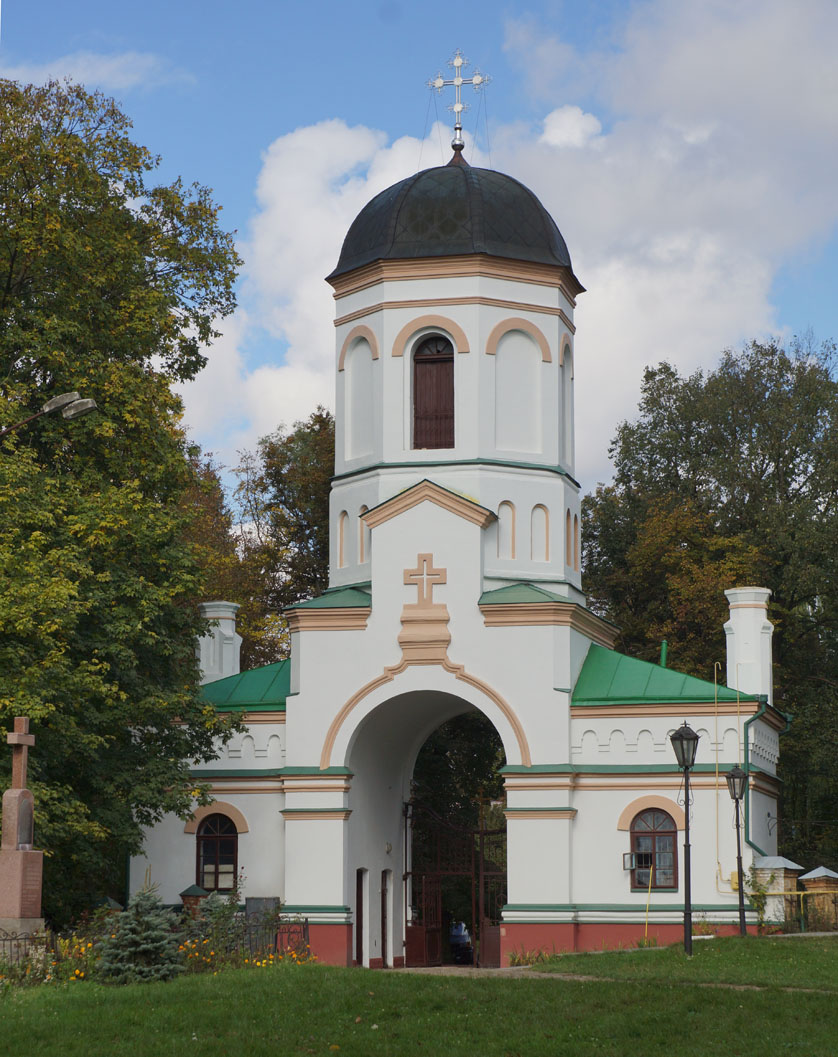
Entrance to the Orthodox cathedral complex.

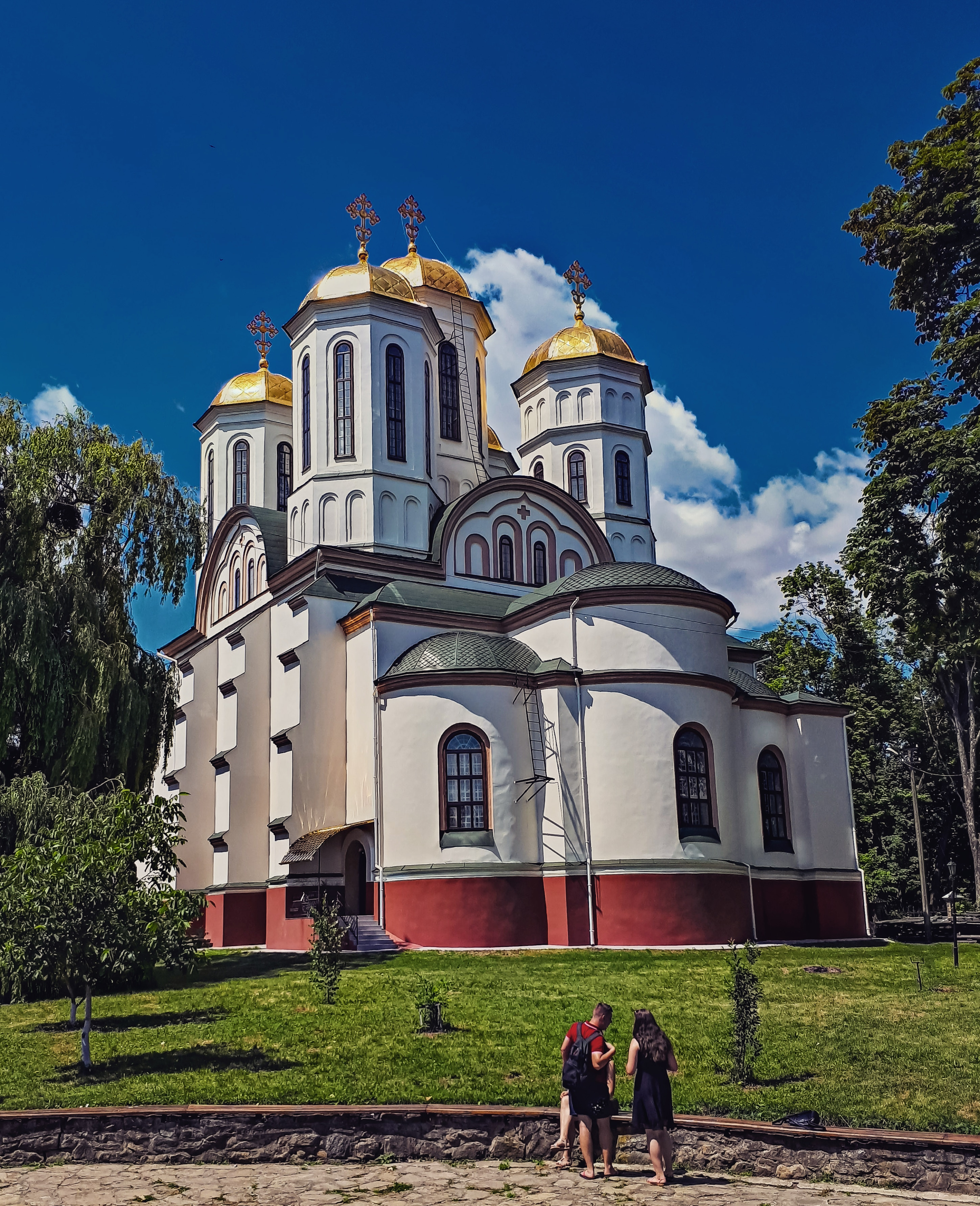
Cathedral of the Epiphany (ca. 1521, restored 1887–91)

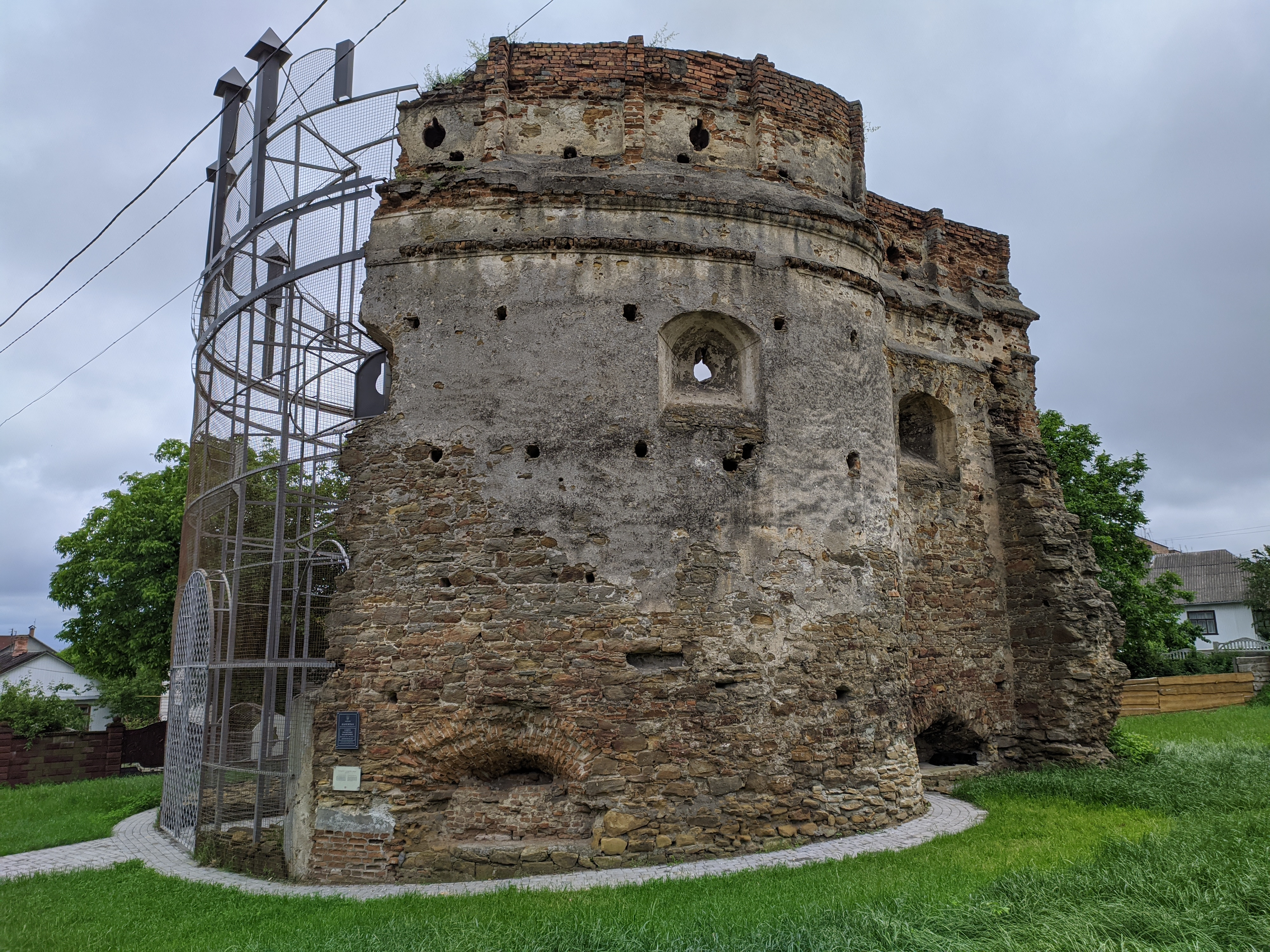
Tatar Tower Gate (ca. 1500)

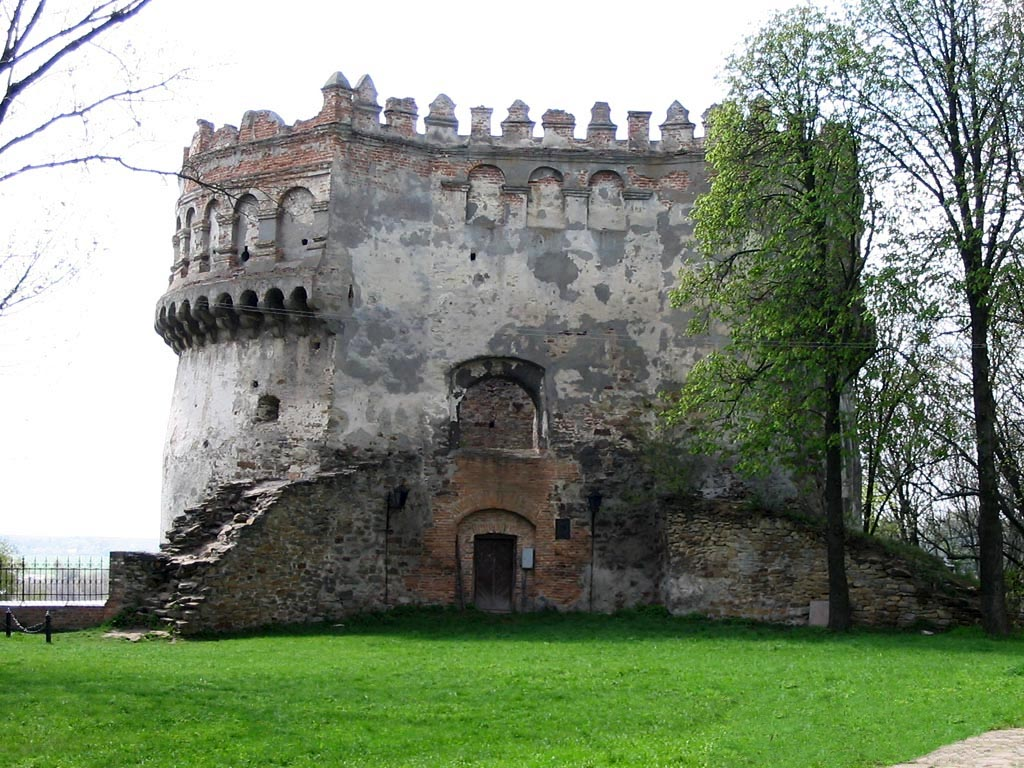
"New" Round Tower (ca. 1500)

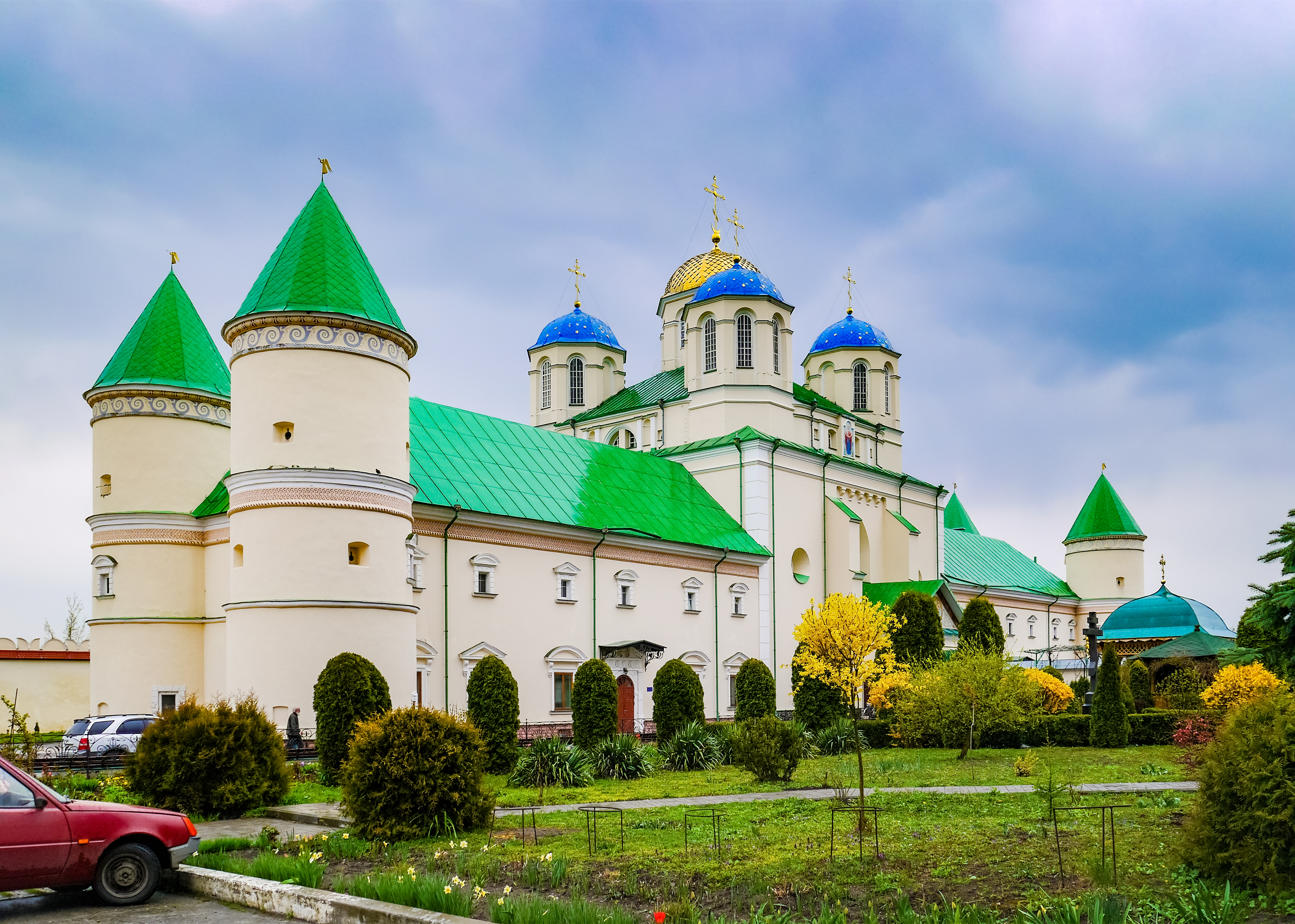
15th-century Church of the Trinity of the Mezhyrich Monastery

== See also ==
- Ostrogski family
- Ivan Fyodorov (printer)
- Ostroh Castle
- Ostroh Academy
- National University Ostroh Academy
- Uherský Ostroh
