= Zebi Hirsch Kaidanover =

Lithuanian-born rabbi and writer (c. 1650 – 1712)

Rabbi Zebi Hirsch Kaidanover

Personal life
- Born: c. 1650 Wilna
- Died: 23 March 1712 Frankfurt
- Buried: Frankfurt
- Parent: Aaron Samuel Kaidanover (father)

Religious life
- Religion: Judaism
- Yahrtzeit: 15 Adar II (Shushan Purim), 5472
- Residence: Wilna

Rabbi Ẓebi Hirsch Kaidanover (c. 1650 – 1712), a native of Wilna; was the author of Kav ha-Yashar (Hebrew: קב הישר).

He was the son of Rabbi Aaron Samuel Kaidanover and a pupil of Rabbi Joseph ben Judah Jeidel, rabbi of Minsk and later of Dubno. Rabbi Joseph's teaching exercised a considerable influence upon his pupil, especially in the kabbalistic trend of his studies; whereas in the Halakha, Rabbi Zebi Hirsch followed more closely his father.

In his native place, Rabbi Zebi Hirsch, with his whole family, was thrown into prison on account of a base denunciation, and was forced to languish in chains for years until he was pardoned, his son being retained in prison at Slutsk. Fearing another imprisonment, he decided to settle in Frankfurt.

In Frankfurt he recovered from the trials through which he had passed and found leisure to engage in literary pursuits. Besides publishing his father's works, which he in part accompanied with notes (as in the case of "Birkat Shemuel"), he wrote a book on morals entitled "Kav ha-Yashar," being a combination of ethics and asceticism. It has passed through numerous editions since its first appearance at Frankfurt in 1705. The book contains 102 chapters, corresponding to the numerical value of קב. "Ha-Yashar" הישר is an anagram of the author's name (הירש). Rabbi Zebi Hirsch also made a Yiddish translation of his work which has often been published together with the Hebrew text (as ed. Sulzbach, 1815). A similar book on morals was written by his son-in-law, Rabbi Manoah Hendel Kirchhahn, under the title "Simḥat ha-Nefesh" (שמחת הנפש).

He died in Frankfurt on Wednesday 23 March 1712, and was buried in Frankfurt.

The epitaph on his tombstone is given in Horovitz, "Frankfurter Rabbinen," ii. 99.
