= Aaron Samuel Kaidanover =

Lithuanian rabbi (1614–1676)

Aaron Samuel ben Israel Kaidanover (Hebrew: אהרן שמואל קאידנוור; 1614 – December 1676) was a Polish-Lithuanian rabbi. Among his teachers were Jacob Hoeschel and his son Joshua Hoeschel (or Hescehel).

== Biography ==
Kaidanover was born in 1614, in Vilna, according to Deutsch and Mannheimer (1904), but according to Tamar (2007) in Koidanovo, near Minsk, from whence his surname was taken. (Note: In 1614, both Minsk and Vilna were Polish-Lithuanian. While giving Koidanovo as Aaron Samuel's birthplace, the 2007 Encyclopaedia Judaica also states that Kaidanover's son, Zevi Hirsch Kaidanover, was born in Vilna.) During the Khmelnytsky Uprising (1648–1649), Kaidanover fled to Vilna (or, possibly, returned there), where he became a member of the bet din. In 1656, as a result of the Russian-Swedish War and Sweden's invasion of the Polish–Lithuanian Commonwealth, he was forced to flee once again, taking refuge in Kurów. While living in Kurów, he survived the 1655 massacre of Lublin. His home was pillaged by Cossacks, his possessions stolen, his valuable library and manuscripts, along with his own writings, among them, and his two young daughters were murdered. He wrote in 1669 recollecting the traumatic event that he was left with a broken leg in the road, dirtied and bloodied, starving and thirsty, and naked and barefoot in only an undershirt.

He arrived in Moravia an impoverished fugitive. He was elected rabbi successively of Langenlois in Lower Austria, Nikolsburg, Glogau, Fürth, and Frankfurt am Main, and then returned to Poland in 1671 to become the rabbi of Kraków, a position he held until his death on 1 December 1676, while attending the Vaad (council) HaGalil of Kraków that took place in Chmielnik. (Note: 1676, per Michael writing in 1891; however, Azulai (1876) and Horovitz (1882–1885) give 1679. Tamar (2007) also states 1676.)

Kaidenvoer was opposed to the use of Shulchan Aruch and its commentaries in deciding Jewish law and instead supported the use of Arba'ah Turim with commentary of the Beis Yosef, going so far as to tell (letter found in the responsa Nachlas Shiva) a rabbi to sell all of his books and buy himself a set of Arba'ah Turim.

Kaidanover's son Tzvi Hirsch Kaidanover, was a rabbi at Frankfurt and author of Kav ha-Yashar. He printed many of his father's works.

== Works ==
He wrote:

- Birkat ha-Zebaḥ, annotations to the Talmudical tractates of Kodashim (except Hullin and Bekorot), with a preface in which he narrated the remarkable events of his life (edited by his son-in-law Nahum Kohen, brother of Shabbethai Kohen (ש"ך), Amsterdam, 1669; another edition, with the commentary Omer Man, appeared in 1773 [location of publication uncertain, but possibly Berlin]).
- Birkat Shemuel, derashot on the Pentateuch, partly kabbalistic, with additions by his son Zebi Hirsch Kaidanover (often "Zevi" Hirsch Kaidanover), its editor (Frankfort-on-the-Main, 1682)
- Emunat Shemuel, sixty responsa on matrimonial cases, edited by his son (Frankfort, 1683)
- Tiferet Shemuel, novellæ (Note: Another term for chiddush, any new approach to, or interpretation of, established ideas or texts, especially venerated texts.) to various Talmudic tractates, also edited by his son (Frankfort, 1692). The annotations to Hoshen Mishpat contained in the last-named work were printed in Ture Zahav (Hamburg, 1692).

== Jewish Encyclopedia bibliography ==
- Azulai (1876). Shem ha-Gedolim. Warsaw. Vol. i: 124b
- Benjacob, Isaac ben Jacob (1880). Otzar ha-Sefarim, Thesaurus Librorum Hebræorum. ['Otzar ha-Sefarim, a treasury of Hebrew books']. Vilnius. pp. 41, 87, 88, 659
- Emden, Jacob (1896). Megillat Sefer. Warsaw. p. 5
- Fürst, Julius (1863). Bibliotheca Judaica, Leipzig: Wilhelm Engelmann. Vol. I, p. 201; Vol. II, p. 200
- Grätz, Heinrich (1853–1875). Gesch. Vol. X, p. 81; (Geschichte der Juden von den ältesten Zeiten bis auf die Gegenwart. ['History of the Jews from the most ancient times to the present']: 11 volumes. Leipzig: Leiner.)
- Horovitz, Márkus (1882–1885). Frankfurter Rabbinen. ['Frankfurt rabbis']. Frankfurt am Main. Vol. ii: pp. 49–53, 99
- Kaufmann, David (1889) Vertreibung der Juden aus Wien. ['Expulsion of the Jews from Vienna']. Vienna. p. 62, note 6
- Michael, Heimann Joseph (1891). Or ha-Ḥayyim. Frankfort-on-the-Main. No. 317
- Steinschneider, Moritz, (1852–1860). Catalogus librorum hebraeorum in Bibliotheca Bodleiana. Berlin. cols. 772, 886.
