= Mainroth station =

Railway station in Germany

Mainroth

General information
- Location: Bahnweg; 96224 Burgkunstadt; Bavaria; Germany
- Coordinates: 50.1208°N 11.3191°E
- Owner: DB Netz
- Operator: DB Station&Service
- Line: Bamberg–Hof railway
- Platforms: 2 side platforms
- Tracks: 2
- Train operators: Agilis

Other information
- Station code: 3897
- DS100 code: NMRH
- IBNR: 8003814
- Category: 6
- Fare zone: VGN: 1351
- Website: www.bahnhof.de

Services
Preceding station		Following station
Burgkunstadt towards Bamberg	RB 22 Limited service	Mainleus One-way operation
Burgkunstadt towards Coburg	RB 24	Mainleus towards Bayreuth Hbf
Preceding station	DB Regio Bayern	Following station
Burgkunstadt towards Lichtenfels	RE 32 Limited service	Mainleus One-way operation
Burgkunstadt towards Lichtenfels	RE 35 Limited service	Mainleus One-way operation
Location
- Location within Bavaria Location within Germany Location within Europe

Mainroth station is a railway station in the Mainroth district of the town of Burgkunstadt, located in the Lichtenfels district in Upper Franconia, Germany.
