= Tiszaladány =

Coordinates: 48°04′N 21°25′E

- Village
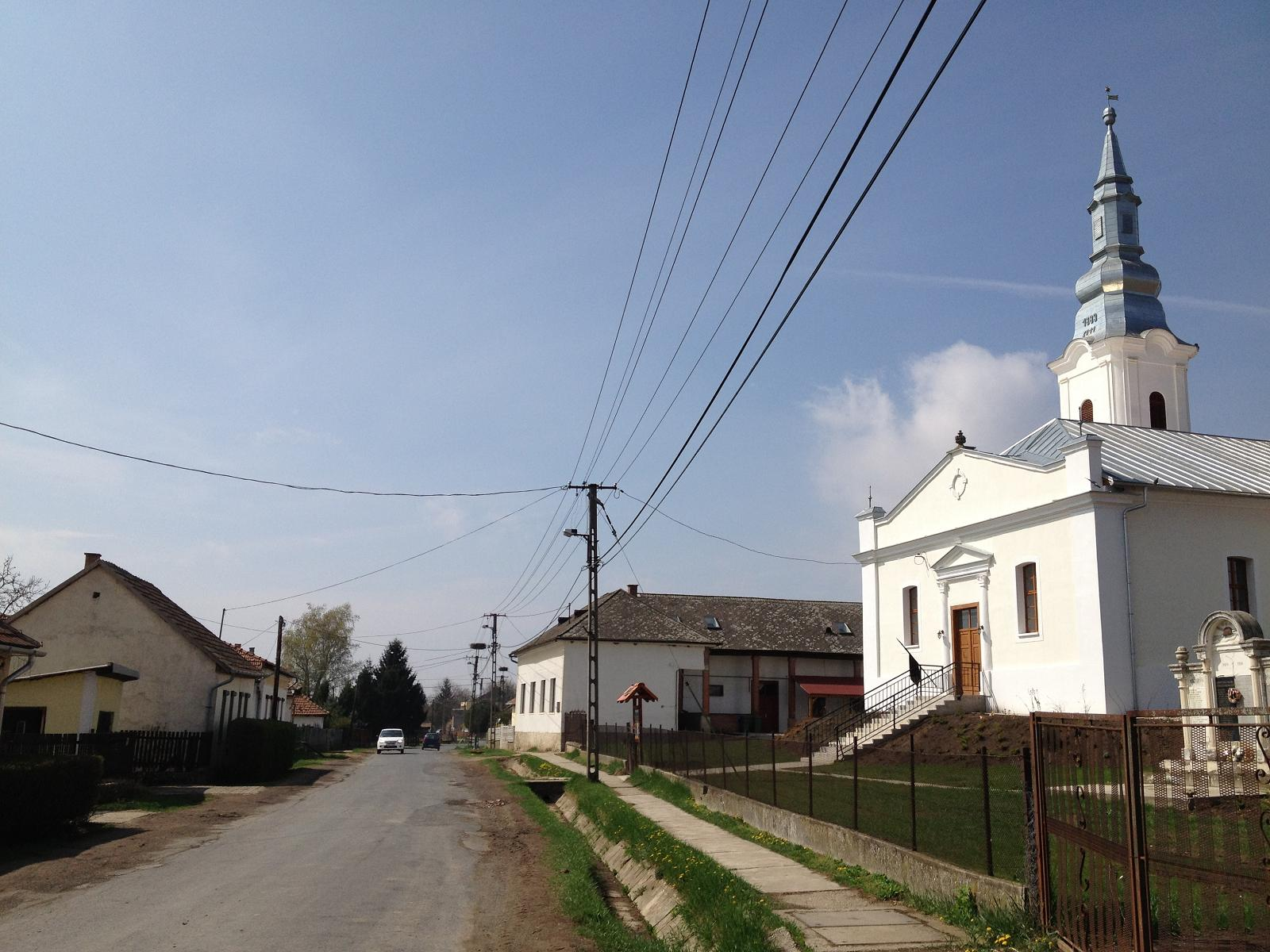
- Village of Tiszaladany
- Interactive map of Tiszaladány
- Country: Hungary
- Regions: Northern Hungary
- County: Borsod-Abaúj-Zemplén County
- Time zone: UTC+1 (CET)
  - Summer (DST): UTC+2 (CEST)

Tiszaladány is a village in Borsod-Abaúj-Zemplén County in northeastern Hungary.

== History ==
The town was first mentioned in a charter from the library of the Kállay family in 1446. Later on the Rákóczi family owned the town and the surrounding area.

At the beginning of the 20th century the town had a population of 1142, and 120 houses.

== Notable residents ==
- Márkus Horovitz (1844-1919), rabbi and historian
- Gyula Csikai (1930-2021), nuclear physicist
- József Bényei (1934-2017), journalist and author
