= Kav ha-Yashar =

Jewish philosophical and ethical text

Kav ha-Yashar (lit. The Just Measure; קב הישר), authored by Tzvi Hirsch Kaidanover (c. 1648–1712), a rabbi at Frankfurt and son of Aaron Samuel Kaidanover, is an "ethical-kabbalistic collection of stories, moral guidance, and customs", and one of the most popular works of musar literature. It serves as a guide to "God-fearing piety and to preserving the norms of the community", framing its teachings in the context of "individual providence and the reckoning of sins and merits". The title of the work alludes to the number of chapters it contains (102, the numerological value of קב kav), as well as the author's middle name (הירש Hirsh is anagrammatic to ha-Y'shar הישר).

Kav ha-Yashar was known for uplifting the spirits of Jewish communities in Europe after the Chmelnitzki Massacres of 1648-1649. First published in 1705 in Frankfurt am Main, it has appeared in over 80 editions in nearly every country with a Jewish community. Kaidanover also prepared a Yiddish version, which went through at least 10 editions.

The work draws on "Yesod Yosef", a musar work infused with the Kabbalistic teachings of Isaac Luria, written by Kaidanover's teacher, Yosef Yoske of Dubno; Kav ha-Yashar constitutes "a deliberate effort to popularize Safedian Kabbalah by adopting a much more understandable style in Hebrew." Relatedly, it reflects, to some extent, a Kabbalistic dualism, dividing all aspects of reality "according to their affinity" either with the divine or with impurity. A Ladino translation was printed in Istanbul during the reign of Sultan Abdulaziz, by the Armenian publisher Tatyos Divitchiyan.
