= Shelomo Dov Goitein =

German-Jewish ethnographer, historian and Arabist (1900–1985)

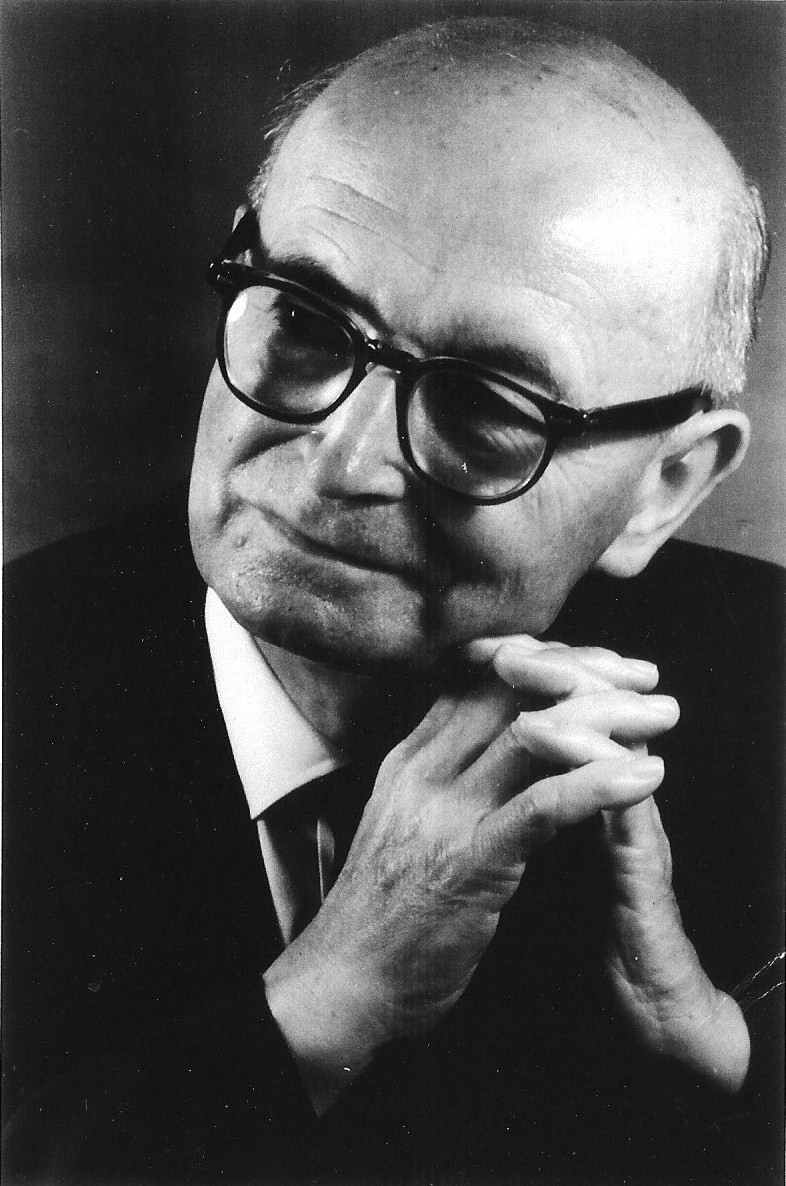
- Goitein, c. 1978.
- Born: April 13, 1900; Burgkunstadt, Bavaria, Germany
- Died: February 6, 1985 (aged 84); Princeton, New Jersey, U.S.

Academic background
- Education: University of Frankfurt
- Academic advisor: Josef Horovitz

Academic work
- Notable students: David Ayalon, Norman Stillman

Shelomo Dov Goitein (April 3, 1900 – February 6, 1985) was a German-Jewish ethnographer, historian and Arabist known for his research on Jewish life in the Islamic Middle Ages, and particularly on the Cairo Geniza.

== Biography ==
Shelomo Dov (Fritz) Goitein was born in the town of Burgkunstadt in Upper Franconia, Germany. His father, Dr. Eduard Goitein, was born in Hungary to a long line of rabbis. The name Goitein may be derived from Kojetín (in Moravia) as the city of origin of the Goitein family. He was brought up with both secular and Talmudic education. In 1914, his father died and the family moved to Frankfurt am Main, where he finished high school and university.

During 1918–23, he studied Arabic and Islam at the University of Frankfurt under the guidance of the famous scholar Josef Horovitz while continuing his Talmudic study with a private teacher. He left the university with a dissertation on prayer in Islam. In the year 1923, Goitein fulfilled his lifelong dream and, together with Gershom Scholem, immigrated to Palestine, where he stayed for thirty-four years. He lived in Haifa for four years before being invited to lecture at the Hebrew University of Jerusalem, which had been inaugurated two years earlier. In Jerusalem, he married Theresa Gottlieb (1900–1987), a eurhythmics teacher who composed songs and plays for children. They had three children, Ayala Gordon, Ofra, and Elon.

In 1957, he moved to the United States. He settled in Philadelphia and became a professor at the University of Pennsylvania ("Penn"). He remained on the Penn faculty, in the Department of Oriental Studies, from 1957 to 1971. After retiring, he later worked at the Institute for Advanced Study in Princeton where, in 1983, he won a MacArthur Fellowship; he was the oldest recipient of the fellowship at the time. He died on February 6, 1985, the day his last volume of the series A Mediterranean Society: The Jewish Communities of the Arab World as Portrayed in the Documents of the Cairo Geniza (vol. 5) was sent to the publisher. The first delivery of The Individual: Portrait of a Mediterranean Personality of the High Middle Ages as Reflected in the Cairo Geniza had been sent to the University of California Press on December 26, 1984.

== Academic career ==
From 1918 to 1923, Goitein attended the Universities of Frankfurt and Berlin and studied Islamic history under Josef Horovitz. His Ph.D. thesis was on prayer in Islam. He also pursued Jewish studies, and was a leader in the Zionist youth movement. In 1923, he immigrated to Palestine, where he taught Bible and Hebrew language at the Reali School in Haifa. In 1927, he wrote a play called Pulcellina about the blood libel killings in Blois in 1171. In 1928, he was appointed professor of Islamic History and Islamic Studies at the Hebrew University of Jerusalem. He was founder of the School of Asian and African studies and of the Israel Oriental Society. In 1928, he began his research of the language, culture, and history of the Jews of Yemen. In 1949, he did research in Aden as Yemenite Jews gathered for their evacuation to the nascent Jewish State. In 1938-1948, he served as a senior education officer in Mandatory Palestine—responsible for Jewish and Arab schools—and published books on methods of teaching the Bible and Hebrew.

Goitein dedicated his version of Genealogies of the Nobles by 9th century Muslim historian Al-Baladhuri, published in 1938, to fellow Hebrew University Arabist Levi Billig, who had been murdered a year earlier by an Arab assassin during the 1936-1939 Arab revolt in Palestine.

From 1948, Goitein began his life's work on the Cairo Geniza documents. An especially rich geniza with a large volume of correspondence was discovered in Old Cairo containing thousands of documents dating from the 9th to the 13th centuries. As many Jews began letters and documents with the words "With the help of God," the papers reflected all aspects of everyday life in the countries of North Africa and bordering the Mediterranean. The documents included many letters from Jewish traders en route from Tunisia and Egypt to Yemen and ultimately to India. The papers were mostly written in Judeo-Arabic characters. After deciphering the documents, and during his time as a professor at the University of Pennsylvania (1955–71), Goitein vividly reconstructed many aspects of Jewish life in the Middle Ages, publishing them in a six-volume monumental series, A Mediterranean Society: The Jewish communities of the Arab World as Portrayed in the Documents of the Cairo Geniza (1967–1993). Although the documents were written by Jews, they reflect the surrounding Muslim and Christian environments not only in countries bordering the Mediterranean but all the way to India. This has thrown new light on the whole study of the Middle Ages. Goitein consulted extensively the Haskell Isaacs's catalogue of the Wellcome Collection and the Cairo Geniza material, of which he was considered the preeminent scholar.

== Agnon correspondence ==
Goitein's lengthy correspondence with the Nobel Prize-winning author S.Y. Agnon was published by his daughter, Ayala Gordon, in 2008. Agnon's wife, Esther, had studied Arabic privately with Goitein while she was a student at the University of Frankfurt. When Goitein moved to Jerusalem, he and Agnon became close friends. Most of the letters are from the mid-1950s onwards, after Goitein left Israel, a move of which Agnon was highly critical.

== Awards and recognition ==
Goitein was awarded honorary degrees from many universities. He received research awards from Guggenheim (1965), Harvey (1980), and the MacArthur lifetime fellowship (1983). He was an elected member of the American Philosophical Society (1970).

He received the National Jewish Book Award Scholarship for A Mediterranean Society Vol. IV in 1984.

== Published works ==
- A Mediterranean Society: The Jewish Communities of the Arab World as Portrayed in the Documents of the Cairo Geniza, Vol. I: Economic Foundations, University of California Press (September 1, 2000), ISBN 0-520-22158-3
- A Mediterranean Society: The Jewish Communities of the Arab World as Portrayed in the Documents of the Cairo Geniza, Vol. II: The Community, 1967
- A Mediterranean Society: The Jewish Communities of the Arab World as Portrayed in the Documents of the Cairo Geniza, Vol. III: The Family, ISBN 0-520-22160-5
- A Mediterranean Society: The Jewish Communities of the Arab World as Portrayed in the Documents of the Cairo Geniza, Vol. IV: Daily Life, ISBN 0-520-22161-3
- A Mediterranean Society: The Jewish Communities of the Arab World as Portrayed in the Documents of the Cairo Geniza, Vol. V: The Individual, ISBN 0-520-22162-1
- A Mediterranean Society: The Jewish Communities of the Arab World as Portrayed in the Documents of the Cairo Geniza, Vol. VI: Cumulative Indices, ISBN 0-520-22164-8
- The Land of Sheba: Tales of the Jews of Yemen, 1947
- Religion in a Religious Age, June 1996
- Jews and Arabs: Their Contact Through the Ages, 1955
- Letters of Medieval Jewish Traders, translated from the Arabic with an introduction and notes, Princeton University Press, 1973, ISBN 0-691-05212-3
- Jews and Arabs: A Concise History of Their Social and Cultural Relations (a reprint of Jews and Arabs: Their Contact Through the Ages)
- India Traders of the Middle Ages: Documents From the Cairo Geniza (ISBN 9789004154728), 2008 (also known as "India Book")
- The Yemenites – History, Communal Organization, Spiritual Life (Selected Studies), editor: Menachem Ben-Sasson, Jerusalem 1983, ISBN 965-235-011-7
- Jemenica: Sprichwörter und Redensarten aus Zentral-Jemen / mit zahlreichen Sach- und Worterläuterungen (A collection of c. 1,500 proverbs and sayings from central Yemen), Leipzig 1934

=== Bibliographies ===
Two editions of his bibliographies are available:
1. Attal, Robert. A Bibliography of the writings of Prof. Shelomo Dov Goitein, Israel Oriental society and the Institute of Asian and African Studies, The Hebrew University of Jerusalem, 1975. It includes among other articles an introduction by Richard Ettinghausen, as well as Goiteins own article:"The Life Story of a Scholar", 547 publications are mentioned.
2. Attal, Robert. A Bibliography of the writings of Prof. Shelomo Dov Goitein, Yad Ben Zvi Jerusalem 2000, an expanded edition containing 737 titles, as well as general Index and Index of Reviews.
3. Udovitch, A.L., Rosenthal, F. and Yerushalmi, Y.H. Shelomo Dov Goitein 1900-1985 Memorial comments, The Institute of Advanced Study Princeton, 1985
