= Levi Billig =

Anglo-Jewish orientalist (1897–1936)

Levi (Louis) Bellig
- לוי ביליג
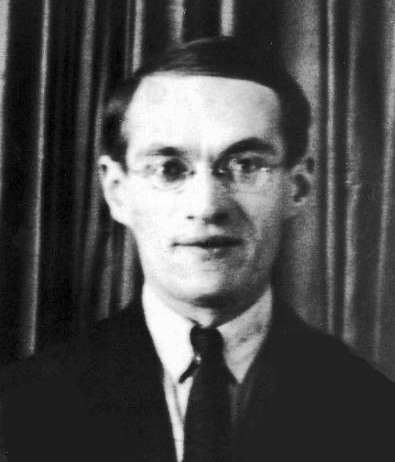
- Born: 1897; London, England
- Died: 22 August 1936 (aged 39)
- Resting place: Mount of Olives Jewish Cemetery
- Known for: pioneering Arabic studies in Hebrew
- Scientific career
- Fields: Oriental studies, Arabic literature

Levi (Lewis) Billig (Hebrew: לוי ביליג; 1897 – 22 August 1936) was an Anglo-Jewish orientalist and scholar of Arabic. One of the pioneers of Arabic education in the Yishuv in Mandatory Palestine, Billig co-edited the first Arabic textbook for Hebrew-speaking students and was the first lecturer in Arabic language and literature at Hebrew University of Jerusalem.

Billig was murdered in 1936 by an Arab assassin in his home in the early months of the 1936-1939 Arab revolt in Palestine.

== Early life ==
Billig was born in London, England, in 1897. He earned two master's degrees, in classics from London University in 1920 and in Oriental Studies from Trinity College, Cambridge in 1925. At Cambridge, his professors included Edward Granville Browne, Anthony Ashley Bevan, and Reynold A. Nicholson. He also studied at Jews' College London.

== Academic career ==
In 1926, Hebrew University administrator Judah L. Magnes appointed German scholar Josef Horovitz as the inaugural Visiting Director of the university's School of Oriental Studies. Billig was appointed the first lecturer in Arabic Language and Literature and oversaw the new department's research work. Billig was the only one of the eight founders of the School of Oriental Studies not to graduate from a German university.

Billig's research interests included early Shi'ite literature. He began work on an edition of Basa'ir ad-Darajat, a compilation of Hadiths among Shias.

In the late 1920s, Billig was involved in advancing efforts to teach Arabic in Jewish schools in the Yishuv. He participated in the inaugural meeting in 1927 of Arthur Biram and David Yellin's "committee for Arabic studies in high schools". At the meeting, the committee agreed to compose an Arabic Reader textbook, edited by Billig and David Yellin's son Avinoam Yellin, an Arabic scholar and orientalist. Despite the outbreak of the 1929 Palestine riots, progress on the textbook continued, and Billig and Yellin published their textbook Mukhtarat al-Qira'a (lit. 'Collections of Readings') in 1931, the first ever educational material designed for Hebrew-speaking students.

In the introduction, the editors expressed hope that the book would facilitate Arabic studies. Billig and Yellin included classic Arabic compositions, from the Pre-Islamic era through the modern period, that the editors hoped Jewish students would learn. The textbook was also published in Hebrew and English.

== Death ==
On 22 August 1936, Billig was killed while sitting at his desk in the study of his home in the Jerusalem suburbs by an Arab who shot at Billig through the shutters. At the time of his death, he was working on Basa'ir ad-Darajat, and his corpse was found surrounded by Arabic manuscripts. Billig was one of three Jews killed by Arabs on 22 August, and one of 73 Jews killed since the beginning of the Arab revolt. Hebrew University closed on 23 August in mourning over Billig's murder. According to Yonatan Mendel of Ben-Gurion University, Billig's murder "shook the world of Jewish Orientalism in Palestine to its foundations". Shelomo Dov Goitein dedicated his Hebrew version of Genealogies of the Nobles by 9th century Muslim historian Al-Baladhuri, published in 1938, to Billig.

Billig's death was linked with that of Avinoam Yellin, a frequent Billig collaborator and the son of David Yellin, who was killed in October 1937 during the 1936–1939 Arab revolt in Palestine. Both men had dedicated their lives to the study of and friendship with Arabs. Their deaths marked the symbolic death of the Arabic Reader and signaled a change in Arabic studies for Jewish schools in Palestine, from a grammarian approach to one more practical.
