= Dubno Air Base =

Military air base in Ukraine

Dubno
- IATA: none; ICAO: UKLJ

Summary
- Airport type: Military
- Operator: Unknown
- Location: Dubno
- Elevation AMSL: 735 ft (224 m)
- Coordinates: 50°27′0″N 025°50′0″E

Maps
- Location within Rivne Oblast Location within Ukraine
- Interactive map of Dubno

Runways
Direction	Length		Surface
Direction	ft	m	Surface
	8,202	2,500	Concrete

Dubno (also given as Dubno Northeast) is an air base in Ukraine located 7 km northeast of Dubno. It is a military base with several angled taxiways, capable of parking about 50 fighters.
