= Yosef Yaakov Sabatka =

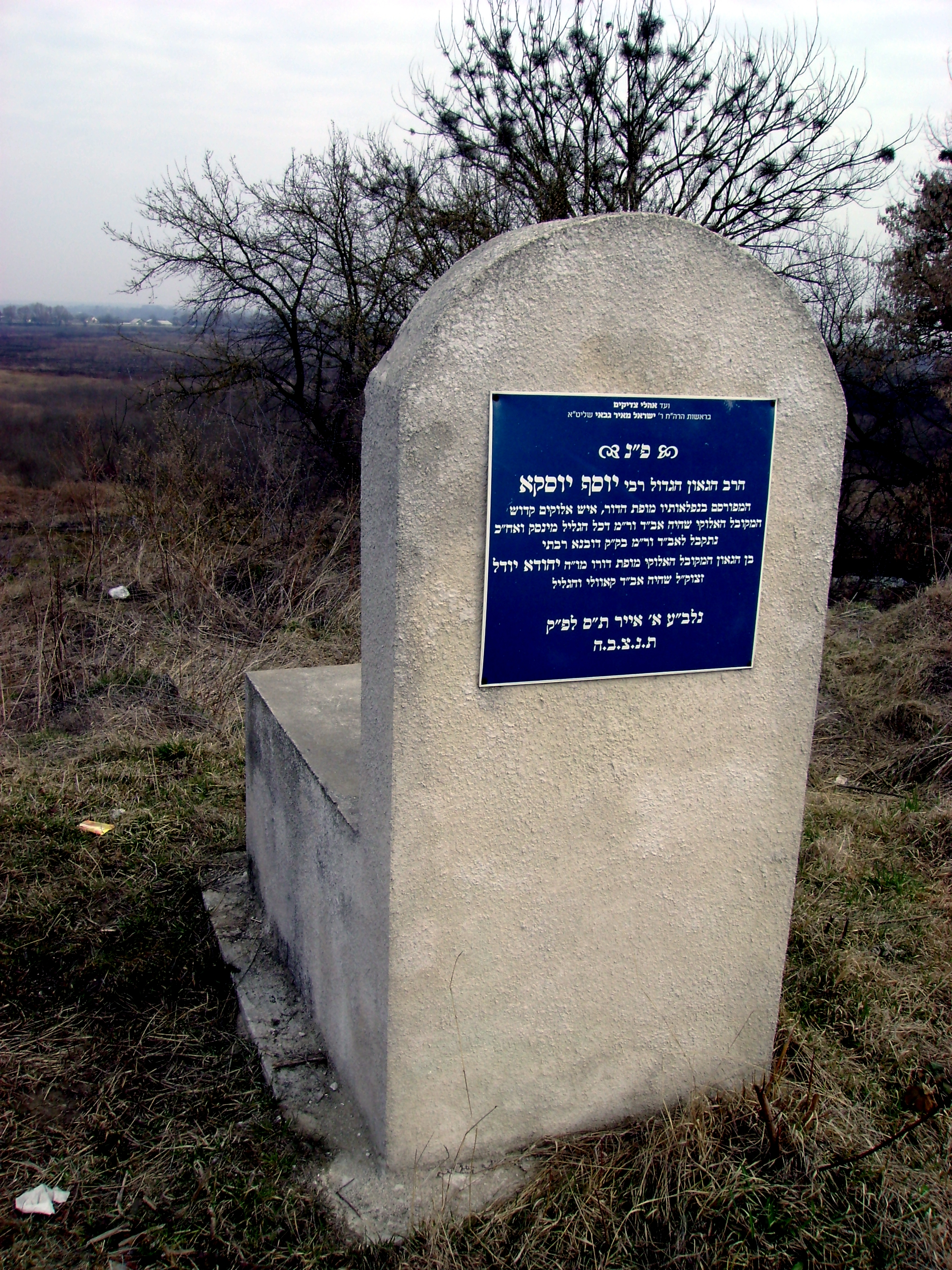
Tombstone of Yosef Yoske

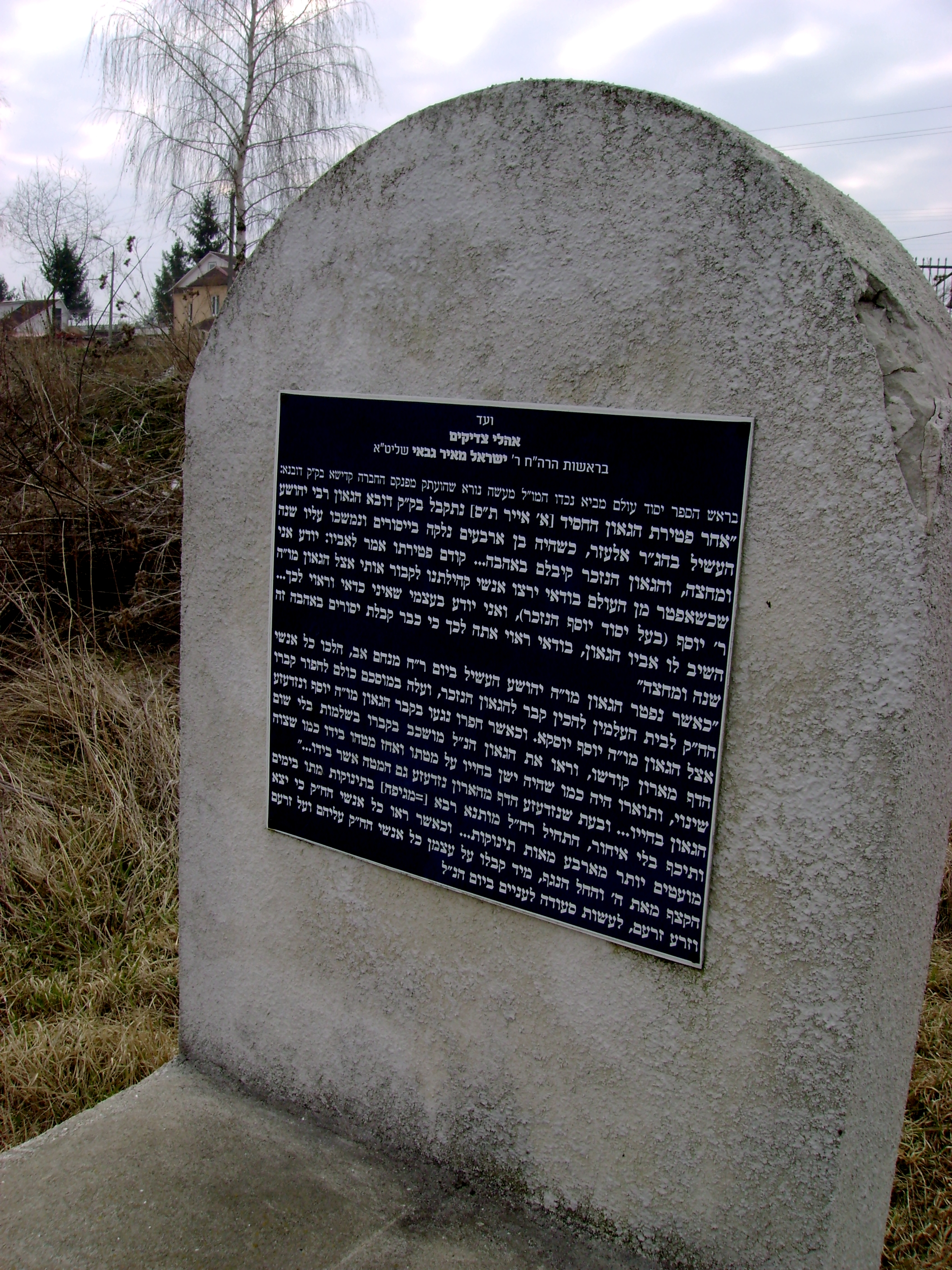
Biographical information displayed on obverse

Yosef Yaakov (Yoske) Sabatka (Hebrew: הרב יוסף יאסקי) was a Torah scholar, moralist and Kabbalist; he is often referred to as "Yosef Yoske of Dubno" (or "Joseph ben Judah Jeidel"). He was born in Lublin in 1659, son of the Av Beit Din and Kabbalist, Yehuda Yudel of Kovel. He was known for his piety, and served as Rabbi for the region of Minsk, and later, in 1698, became Av Beit Din of Dubno; he died there in 1702. Amongst his students is Rabbi Tzvi Hirsch Kaidanover, author of Kav ha-Yashar.

Rabbi Yosef Yoske is the author of two works - "Yesod Yosef" and "Ne'ima Kedosha" - and is often referred to by those titles:

- Yesod Yosef is an ethical work, infused with the Kabbalistic teachings of the Ari. It was first printed in Shklov in 1785.
- Ne'ima Kedosha is a Shabbat zemer (poem) - with commentary and teachings - composed by Yosef Yoske; the work also lists recommended behaviors and customs.
