= Joel Baer Falkovich =

Joel Baer Falkovich (Yiddish: יואל בעריש פאַלקאָװיטש, died in the 1870s) was an early Yiddish Theatre dramatist, literary figure, and supporter of the Haskalah from the Russian Empire.

== Biography ==
Falkovich was born in Dubno, Volhynian Governorate, Russian Empire during the early nineteenth century, although the exact date is uncertain. During his youth he received a full Jewish education and also learned multiple European languages. He soon became an early proponent of the Haskalah (Jewish enlightenment) in Volhynia and pseudonymously published Hebrew language writings. He was said to have a strong command of Hebrew literature and to be an advocate of using it to write about modern, scientific concepts.

At some point he left Dubno and settled in Odessa. He is known to have authored a handful of four-act Yiddish language plays including Reb Chaimele der Koẓin, (printed in Odessa in 1866) and Rochel die Singerin, (printed in Zhytomyr in 1868, and possibly adapted from another work). These were published at a time when secular Yiddish literary works were in demand for the first time, and before the Yiddish theatre was fully established as a genre by Avraham Goldfaden. He also translated Philotas by Gotthold Ephraim Lessing into Hebrew, titling it Avinadav and publishing it in Odessa in 1868. His letters to Abraham Firkovich were also noted.

At some point he converted to Christianity, although he did not turn against the Jewish population, but appeared at trials to defend them against charges of Blood libel and wrote essays in defense of them. Although his exact date of death is unknown, Zalman Reisen speculated that he died in the 1870s.
