= Josef Horovitz =

German Orientalist

- Born: 26 July 1874; Lauenburg, Pomerania, German Empire (now Lębork, Poland)
- Died: 5 February 1931 (aged 56); Frankfurt, Hesse-Nassau, Germany
- Scientific career
- Fields: Oriental studies
- Institutions: University of Frankfurt
- Academic advisors: Eduard Sachau
- Doctoral students: Ilse Lichtenstädter
- Other notable students: Shelomo Dov Goitein

Josef Horovitz (26 July 1874 – 5 February 1931) was a Jewish German orientalist. A son of Markus Horovitz (1844–1910), an Orthodox rabbi, Josef Horovitz studied with Eduard Sachau at the University of Berlin and was there since 1902 as a docent. From 1907 to 1915, he worked in India, at the Muhammadan Anglo-Oriental College at Aligarh (later Aligarh Muslim University) and taught Arabic at the request of the Indian government curator for Islamic inscriptions. In this role, he prepared the collection Epigraphia Indo-Moslemica (1909–1912). After his return to Germany he was from 1914 until his death professor of Semitic languages at the Oriental Seminar of the University of Frankfurt.

In 1926, Hebrew University administrator Judah L. Magnes appointed Horovitz as the inaugural Visiting Director of the university's School of Oriental Studies, with Anglo scholar Levi Billig appointed the first lecturer in Arabic Language.

He focused his studies initially on Arabic historical literature. Then he published a concordance of earlier Arabic poetry. The concordance consists of hundreds of thousands of cards each containing an Arabic word, its root, and its usages in different textual contexts in pre- and early Islamic Arabic poetry. In this manner, Horovitz aimed to reach a true understanding of a words meanings. In addition to the scientific significance of the concordance, Horovitz also hoped it would foster dialogue and understanding between intellectuals of Jewish and Muslim origin in Palestine.

== Main work ==
Handwriting

His main work was a commentary on the Qur'an, which remained unfinished. In his Qur'anic Studies (1926), he used his method of detailed analysis of the language of Muhammad and his followers, and historical insights from his own study of early texts (Hebrew Union College Annual 2, Cincinnati 1925), and in the Qur'anic paradise (Jerusalem 1923) he examined the relationship between Islam and Judaism. His work on India under British rule appeared in 1928 (Leipzig: BG Teubner) and extends from the first dynasty of Delhi Muslims until the emergence of Gandhi.

In response to Ignác Goldziher's theory that Hadith traditions were recorded late in the 2nd and 3rd Hijri centuries, Horovitz showed that the collection and writing of Hadiths started in the first quarter of the 2nd century.

== Bibliography ==
- J. Horovitz: "The Earliest Biographies of the Prophet and Their Authors", translated from the German by Marmaduke Pickthall, Islamic Culture, vol 1: 1927, vol 2: 1925

== Notes ==
- Josef Horovitz' books at the Open Library
