= Burgkunstadt =

- Town
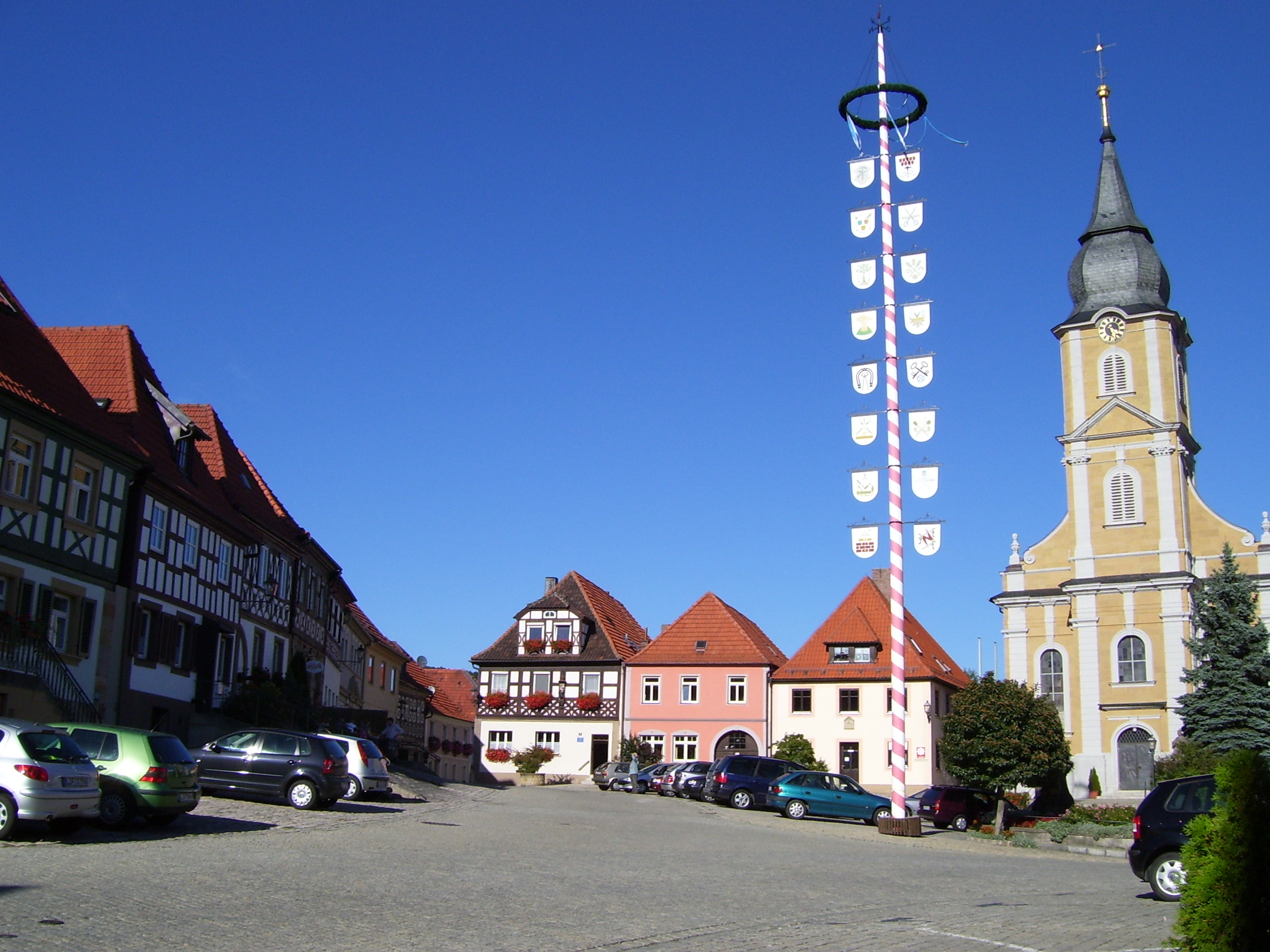
- Town square

- Coat of arms

- Location of Burgkunstadt within Lichtenfels district
- Interactive map of Burgkunstadt
- Location within Germany Location within Bavaria
- Coordinates: 50°08′28″N 11°15′9″E
- Country: Germany
- State: Bavaria
- Admin. region: Oberfranken
- District: Lichtenfels
- Subdivisions: 8 Ortsteile

Government
  - Mayor (2020–26): Christine Frieß (CSU)

Area
  - Total: 40.6 km^{2} (15.7 sq mi)
- Elevation: 304 m (997 ft)

Population (2025-12-31)
  - Total: 6,335
  - Density: 156/km^{2} (404/sq mi)
- Time zone: UTC+01:00 (CET)
  - Summer (DST): UTC+02:00 (CEST)
- Postal codes: 96224
- Dialling codes: 09572
- Vehicle registration: LIF, STE
- Website: www.burgkunstadt.de

Burgkunstadt (German pronunciation: [bʊʁkˈkʊnʃtat]) is a town in the district of Lichtenfels, in northern Bavaria, Germany. It is situated on the right bank of the Main, 15 km west of Kulmbach, and 24 km southeast of Coburg.

== History ==
The earliest archeological evidence of settlement dates to the 8th century, and the first written record of a settlement dates to April 13, 1059 in the time of Friedrich Barbarossa. The city earned its charter on April 27, 1426 under Prince Frederick Bishop of Bamberg.

The town experienced outbreaks of plague in 1312, 1348, 1448, 1473, and 1626. 195 villagers died, approximately one third of the population.

The town fell under the sway of Protestantism in 1517 but returned to Catholicism in 1624. The city's residents supported the peasant revolt of 1525, but the ruling diocese ordered the city plundered as punishment, and the city capitulated in June when order was restored.

In the Second Margrave War of 1553, the town was occupied by Albert Alcibiades who burned nearly the entire town.

In the Thirty Years War, the town was occupied by Swedish troops for one year and five months from 1632 onwards, causing a tremendous decline in living conditions.

The town hall building dates to 1690 and is an archetypical Franconian half-timbered building. During the Seven Years' War, Prussian troops were stationed in the town resulting in yet more destruction and looting. In the Napoleonic wars, the ruling Bishop was forced to resign in 1802, and the town government was secularized. A new main Catholic church dated to 1812.

The town opened to industrialization with the construction of a railway line with service starting on February 15, 1846. A steam boiler factory opened in 1862, and the first telegraph reached the town in 1877. The town became known for its shoe factories, and it supplied military boots during the First World War. Following the war, the town suffered from the rampant inflation of the 1920s.

During the Nazi period, Dr. Leo Feusinger was appointed Mayor, and he led an anti-Jewish boycott on 1 April 1933. The town enthusiastically embraced anti-Jewish policies. The town's synagogue was plundered and destroyed during Kristallnacht of 1938, and the last Jewish residents were deported to Belzec and Sobibor on 24 April 1942 where they were murdered.

The period also saw investments in infrastructure and schools.

Following the war, the town returned to its shoe manufacturing, but production declined and the last factory closed in 1990. The town, in the meantime, became known for its secondary schools.

== Folklore ==
In folklore, Burgkunstadt (anciently Kunostadt) is said to have been home to the giant Rübesam, and the subject of a once-popular children's poem:

Kinder von Kunostadt
esset euch hurtig satt
Schlafet ruhig und zahm
sonst kommt der Riese Rübesam

Children of Kunostadt
Eat quickly as thou ought
Sleep quietly and tame
Else Giant Rübesam thou wilt mame

== Sons and daughters of the town ==
- Johann-Georg Dora, (born 1948), former general of the Bundeswehr
- Shelomo Dov Goitein, (1900–1985), orientalist
- Fridolin Friedmann, (1897–1976), educator
