= Galil (administrative unit) =

In Polish–Lithuanian Commonwealth, a galil was an administrative unit of Jewish internal autonomy. They were governed by Jewish regional councils (va'ad galil).

While initially they matched the Polish structure of voivodeships and other administrative divisions in other parts of the Commonwealth, over time the discrepancies between the state internal borders and those of the Jewish autonomy grew quite pronounced.
