= Dubno =

City in Rivne Oblast, Ukraine

Dubno Дубно
- City
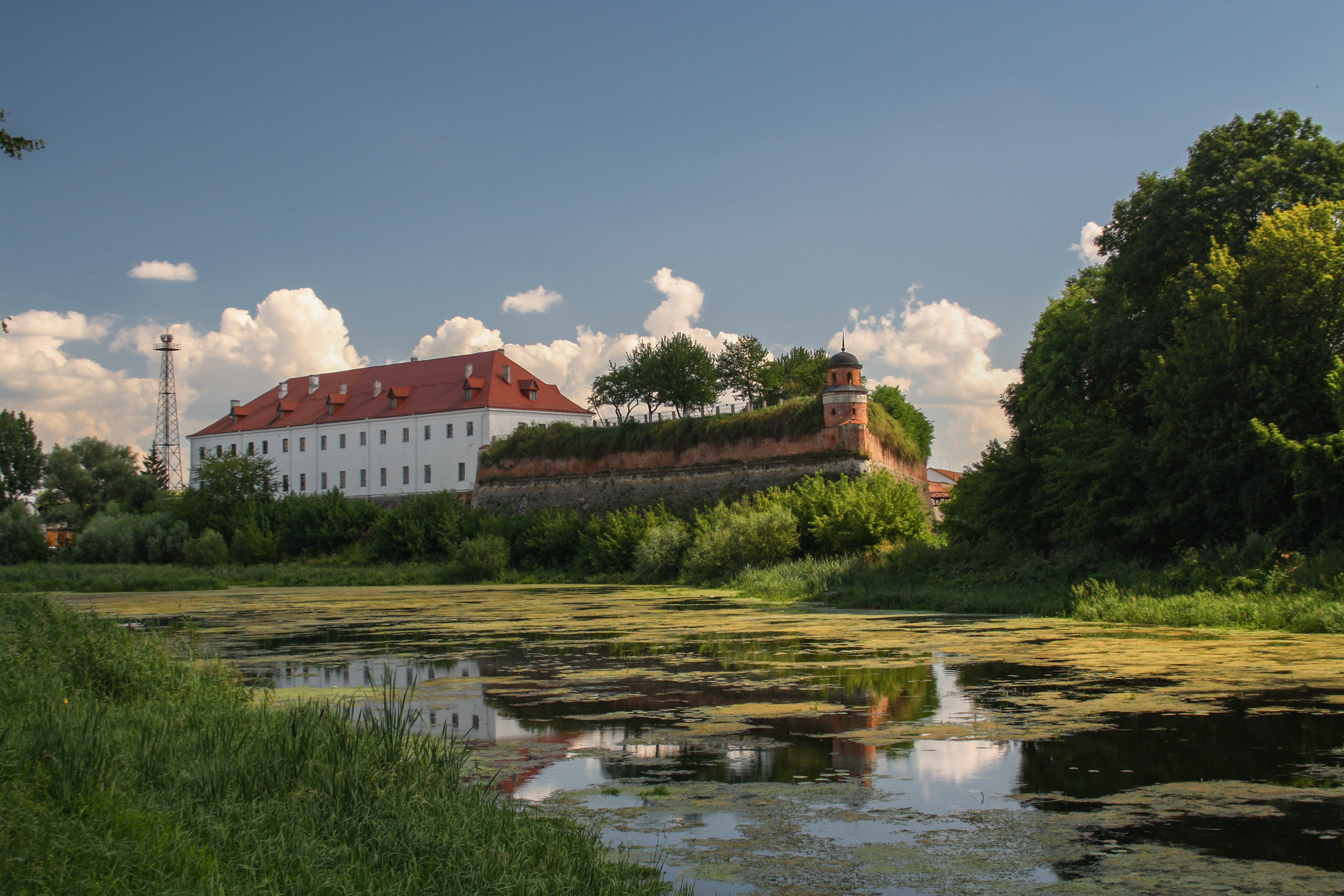
- Dubno Castle over the Ikva river

- Flag Coat of arms
- Interactive map of Dubno
- Location within Rivne Oblast Location within Ukraine
- Coordinates: 50°23′35″N 25°44′06″E
- Country: Ukraine
- Oblast: Rivne Oblast
- Raion: Dubno Raion
- Hromada: Dubno urban hromada
- First mentioned: 1100
- Magdeburg law: 1498

Government
  - Mayor: Vasyl Antoniuk

Area
  - Total: 27 km^{2} (10 sq mi)
- Elevation: 200 m (660 ft)

Population (2022)
  - Total: 36,901
  - Density: 1,400/km^{2} (3,500/sq mi)
- Time zone: UTC+2 (EET)
  - Summer (DST): UTC+3 (EEST)
- Postal code: 35600—35608
- Area code: +380-3656
- Website: www.dubno-adm.rv.ua/newsite/

Dubno (Ukrainian: Дубно, IPA: [ˈdubno]; Polish: Dubno) is a city and municipality located on the Ikva River in Rivne Oblast (province) of western Ukraine. It serves as the administrative center of Dubno Raion (district). The city is located at the intersection of two major European routes, E40 and E85. The city is estimated to have a population of 36,901 (2022 estimate). It is located within the historic region of Volhynia.

In Soviet times it was home to the Cold War facility Dubno air base. The city is also famous for its castle, which was mentioned in the novel Taras Bulba written by Ukrainian-born author Nikolai Gogol.

== History ==
=== Middle Ages ===
First mentioned in a chronicle of 1100, when it was in the possession of Yaroslav the Wise's grandson David of Brest, Dubno (then known as Duben) was a seat of local princes for a short period of time. In 1240 the town was raided by the Mongols. In the 14th century the region was the subject of Polish-Lithuanian rivalry, as a result of which Dubno became part of the latter state. However, soon thereafter with the Union of Krewo (1385), it came under Polish influence as part of the Polish-Lithuanian Union. In 1386 King Władysław II Jagiełło granted Dubno along with nearby Ostróg to magnate Feodor Ostrogski and for the next 200 years it was a private town of the influential Ostrogski family. Later, the city became a notable stronghold in Volhynia. Granted city rights in 1498 by Alexander Jagiellon, the town attracted many foreign settlers, most notably Jewish and Armenian. As such, it became the seat of one of the oldest and most vibrant Jewish communes in Central-Eastern Europe. Under the rule of the Ostrogski family Dubno Castle was constructed.

=== Early modern period ===
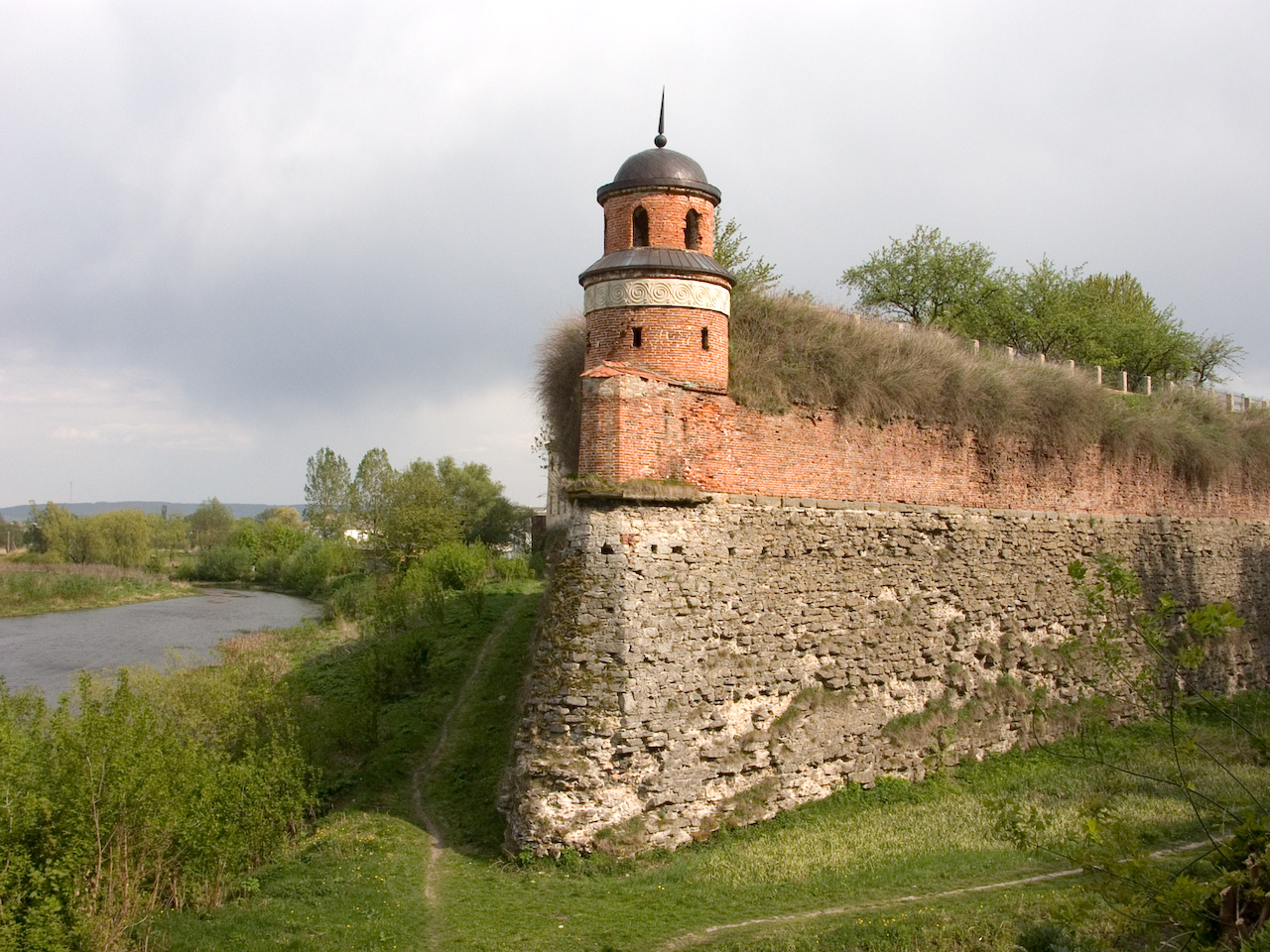
A tower of the Dubno Castle

Between 1489 and 1506 the castle was significantly expanded by Konstanty Ostrogski, who made it a modern fortress, one of the strongest in the area. After 1566 Dubno was part of the Volhynian Voivodeship of the Lesser Poland Province. During the Polish-Russian War of 1605–1618 in 1617, Prince and future King Władysław IV Vasa resided in the city.

With the death of Janusz Ostrogski in 1619, the last of his kin, the area was inherited by his brother-in-law Aleksander Zasławski of the cadet branch of the Ostrogski family. About that time it was again modernized to stand up to the standards of renaissance warfare and modernization of artillery. Finally, in 1673 it passed to the Lubomirski family, which built a new palace within the fortress walls.

The 13th Polish Infantry Regiment, est. in 1766, was stationed in Dubno. In the 1780s the castle underwent yet another modernization and was rebuilt as a residential manor, mostly losing its fortified character. In 1781 King Stanisław August Poniatowski visited Dubno. By that time, the town was the largest settlement of the Volhynian Voivodeship and arguably the most notable centre of the area. In spite of the Partitions of Poland the town initially flourished after the first partition, as the szlachta register was moved there from Lwów, which was annexed by Austria. Dubno itself was annexed by Imperial Russia in 1795 during the Third Partition of Poland, after which the nobility's register was moved to Kyiv and the town lost its importance, gradually falling into neglect.

=== Late modern period ===
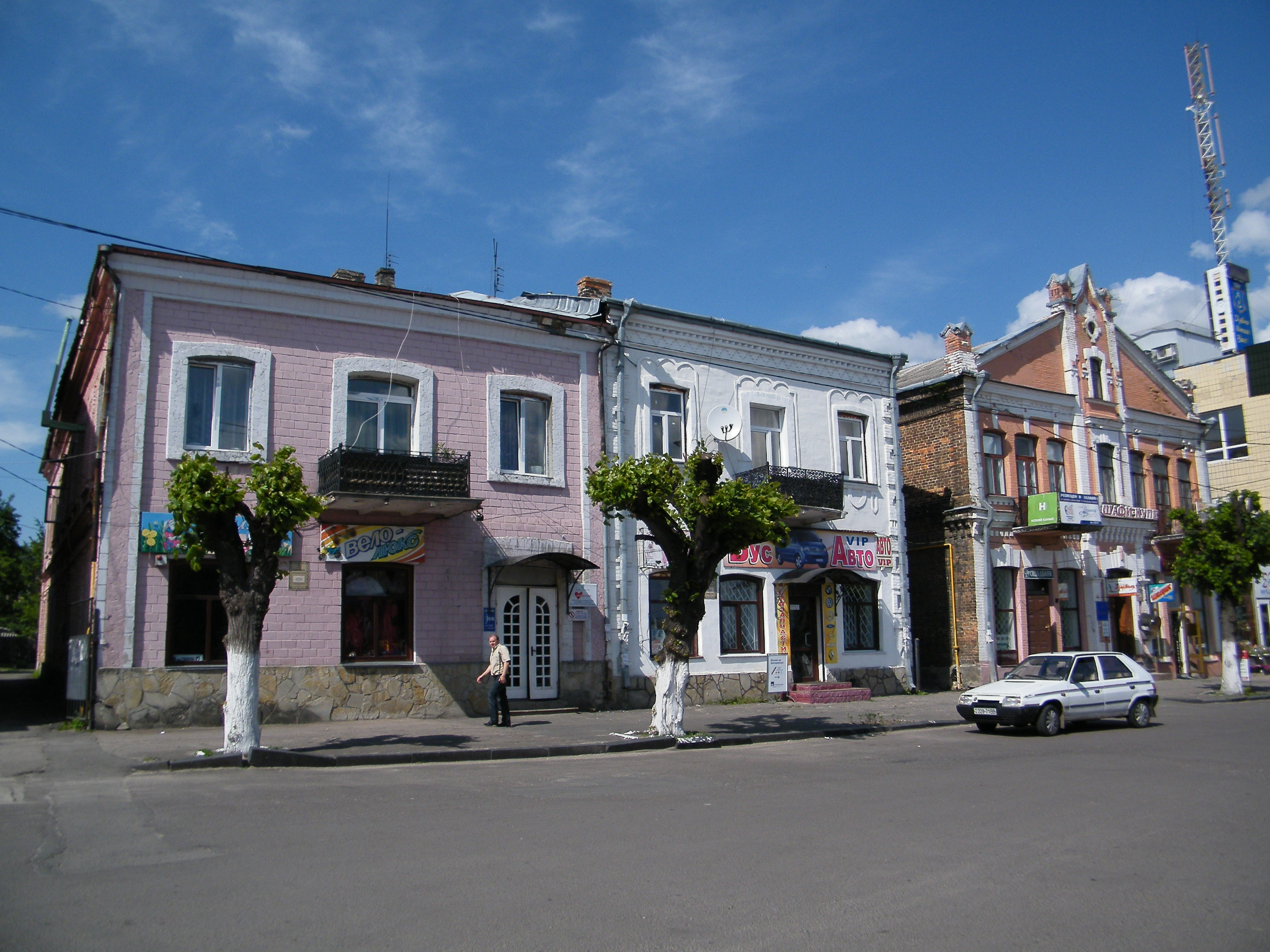
Old centre of Dubno

As part of anti-Polish repressions, the Russian administration closed down the Bernardine and Carmelite monasteries and confiscated them from the Catholic Church. In 1870 Dubno was declared a Fortified Town, which imposed serious limitations on settlement and housing construction, further limiting the development. However, it remained a notable centre of commerce, most notably because of numerous Czech settlements around the town, that gave it the nickname of the brewery of Volhynia. The castle was ruined in 1915 during World War I.

Historic Polish coat of arms of Dubno

Retaken by Poland after the state's independence in 1918 and finally granted to Poland in the Peace of Riga, it was a seat of a powiat and a notable military garrison of both the KOP, and the Polish Army, with the 43rd Rifle Regiment (part of the 13th Kresy Infantry Division), and the 2nd Regiment of Mounted Artillery (part of Volhynian Cavalry Brigade) stationed here. Dubno also was the seat of Papal Eastern Seminary (Papieskie Seminarium Wschodnie). In 1935 a large prison was started to be built, the third biggest in Poland at that time. Between 1932 and 1939 the castle was being rebuilt in its original form, but the works were stopped by the outbreak of World War II. In 1937, its population was app. 15,500, out of which Jews made 45%, Ukrainians 29%, and Poles 26%.

=== World War II and post-war ===
Occupied by the Soviet Union following the Molotov–Ribbentrop Pact of 1939, it was subject to harsh policies of the NKVD. The uncompleted prison was taken over by the NKVD in December 1939 and was used for political prisoners from all parts of Soviet-occupied Poland. Between 1500 and 3000 prisoners were kept there in harsh conditions, with new inmates arriving after the previous ones were successively transported to Gulag and other Soviet prisons. In 1940 most of the local Poles were arrested and resettled to various Soviet Gulags and prisons throughout the USSR.

In 1941, following the outbreak of Soviet-German War, on 24 June and 25 June 1941, approximately 550 prisoners of the Dubno prison were executed by the withdrawing NKVD while only 8 of them survived. About that time in the vicinity of the town (and around Lutsk and Brody) a large tank battle was fought. In the Battle of Brody (1941) the German 1st Panzer Group under Ewald von Kleist managed to break the counter-attack by Soviet 9th and 19th Mechanized Corps, and 8th Mechanized Corps. 8th Corps Tank Group took Dubno and held it for 5 days before it was retaken by stronger German forces' (under Konstantin Rokossovski, Nikolay Feklenko and D.I Rybjasev, Commander of 8th Corps Tank group was brigade commissar N.K. Popel, respectively). Soon afterwards the town was occupied by Germany. During the occupation, the Germans blew up the historic town hall from the 18th century. The Germans operated a Nazi prison, a Wehrmacht-operated military prison and a subcamp of the Stalag 360 prisoner-of-war camp in Dubno.

In the second half of 1943, Dubno became a shelter for ethnic Polish population of Volhynia, who came here to escape the Volhynian Genocide. The town was defended by a unit of Polish self-defence, which was tolerated by German authorities. On February 28, 1944, the Germans evacuated Poles from Dubno to Brody, and then to the Reich, where they became slave workers. In 1944 Dubno found itself again under Soviet occupation and after the war it was taken from Poland and annexed by the Soviet Union in accordance to the Potsdam Conference.

In 1959 the Roman Catholic Church of Saint John Nepomuk was closed down by the Soviets. It was reopened in 1993, thanks to the efforts of the local Polish community.

After the dissolution of the Soviet Union, Dubno became part of Ukraine.

=== Jewish history ===
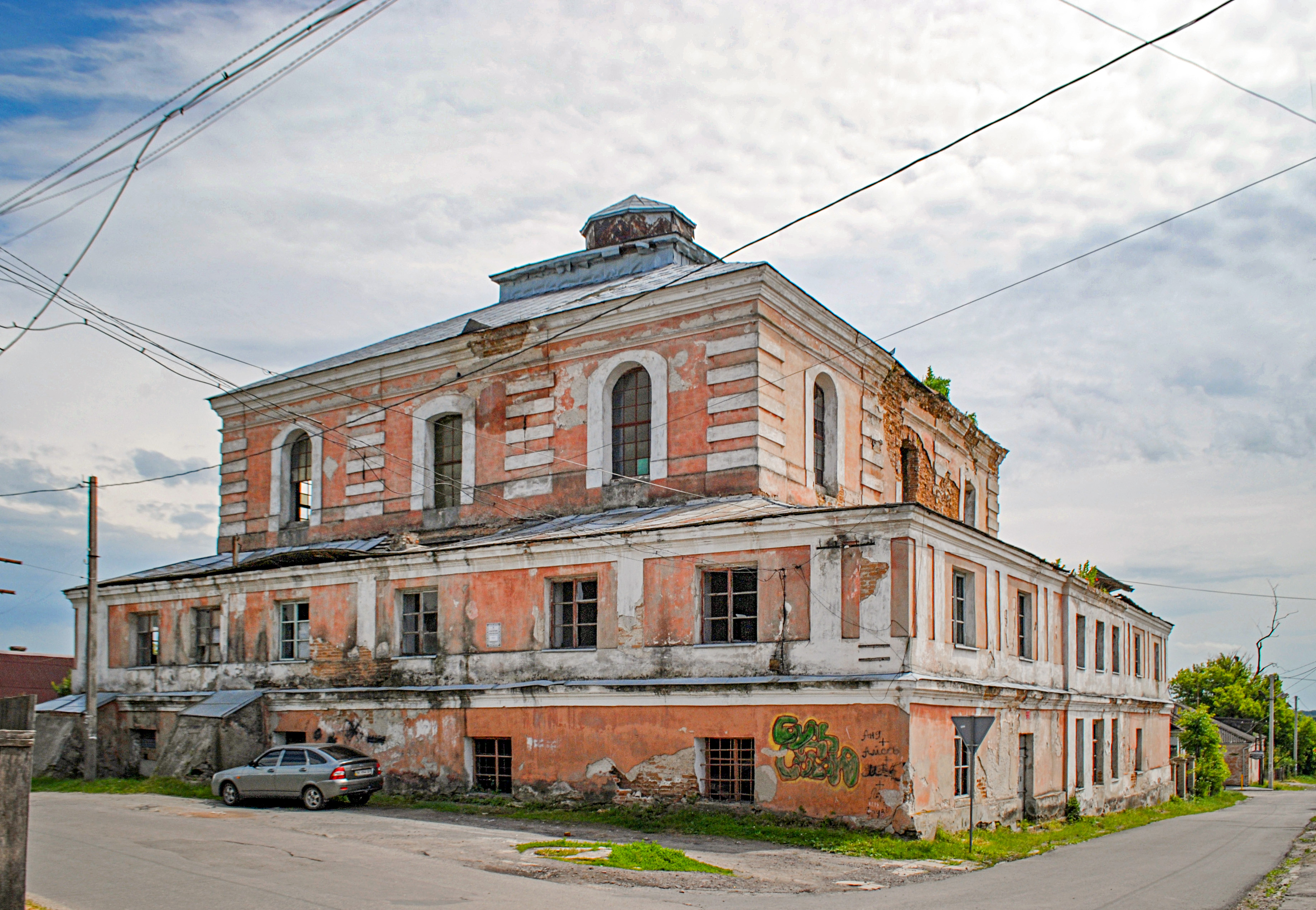
Great Synagogue

According to the census of 1897, Dubno had a population of 13,785, including 5,608 Jews. The main sources of income for the Jewish community were trading and industrial occupations. There were 902 artisans, 147 day-laborers, 27 factory and workshop employees, and 6 families cultivating land. The town had a Jewish hospital and several chederim (Jewish schools). The earliest date given in connection with the Jews of Dubno is the beginning of the 17th century. In 1650, there were 47 Jewish and 141 Christian taxable households.

Dubno is perhaps best known within the Jewish world as the long-time home of Rabbi Yosef Yaakov Sabatka, "Yosef Yoske of Dubno", and of Jacob ben Wolf Kranz, the "Dubno Maggid" (or Dubner Maggid). Hayyim Mordecai Margolioth, author of Sha'are Teshuva, was Rabbi there c. 1810.

The nineteenth century intellectual Joel Baer Falkovich was also born in Dubno and was a pioneer of the Haskalah there, although he relocated to Odessa later in life.

The Nazi occupation of Dubno began on 25 June 1941. During Passover of 1942, a large ghetto was created in the city. The ghetto included the local Jewish population as well as many refugees from other parts of Poland who had fled east. Within the Dubno ghetto, all Jews were identified by the Star of David on an armband. With 12,000 people in a small area, the ghetto became overcrowded and hunger/sickness were abundant. After 24 October 1942, the Jewish community ceased to exist.

Most of the local Jews (roughly 12,000, that is 59% of pre-war inhabitants of the town) were murdered in the Holocaust. They were shot in mass executions by the SS Einsatzgruppe outside of the city. A detailed description of the mass murder was given by Hermann Friedrich Graebe at the Nuremberg trials. A young German officer of the German 9th Infantry Regiment, Axel von dem Bussche, witnessed the executions and reacted by joining the resistance movement against Hitler. Around 300 Jews managed to survive the massacres.

== Religion ==
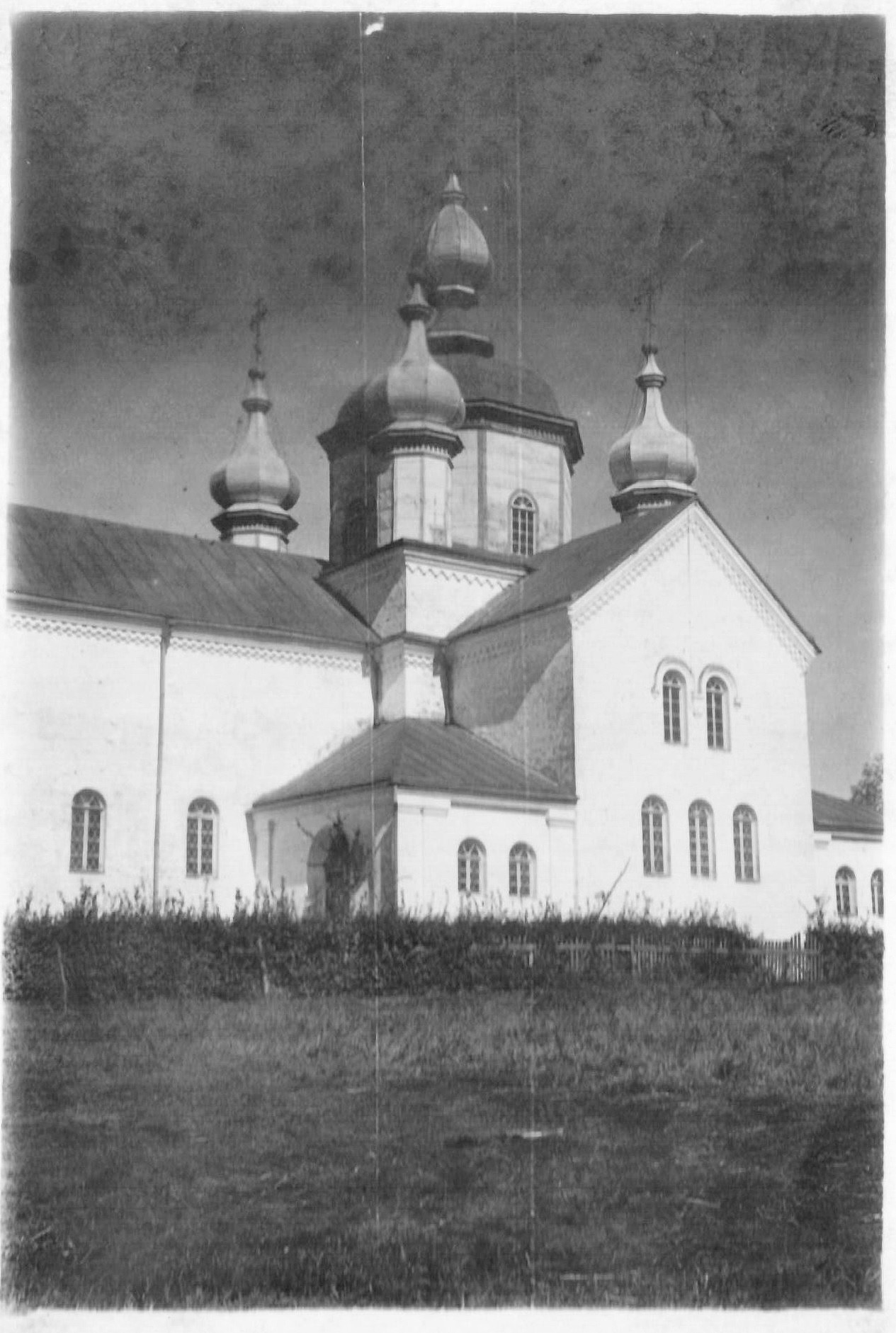
Holy Cross Monastery before destruction

The Holy Saviour Monastery in Dubno was established in 1592 by prince Konstanty Wasyl Ostrogski as an Eastern Orthodox convent. In 1700 it was transferred to the Catholic Church, but during the 19th century returned to Orthodox monks as the male monastery of the Exaltation of the Cross. The monastery was closed in 1939.

== Economy ==
After 1670, Dubno became the location of important trade fairs. In 1774, Lviv "contracts" were transferred to the city, contributing to its economy. However, after 1794 the fair was moved to Kyiv. Under the Polish and Russian rule, local merchants specialized in trading hops. In modern times, Dubno is a centre of butter, canned goods and textile production.

== Gallery ==
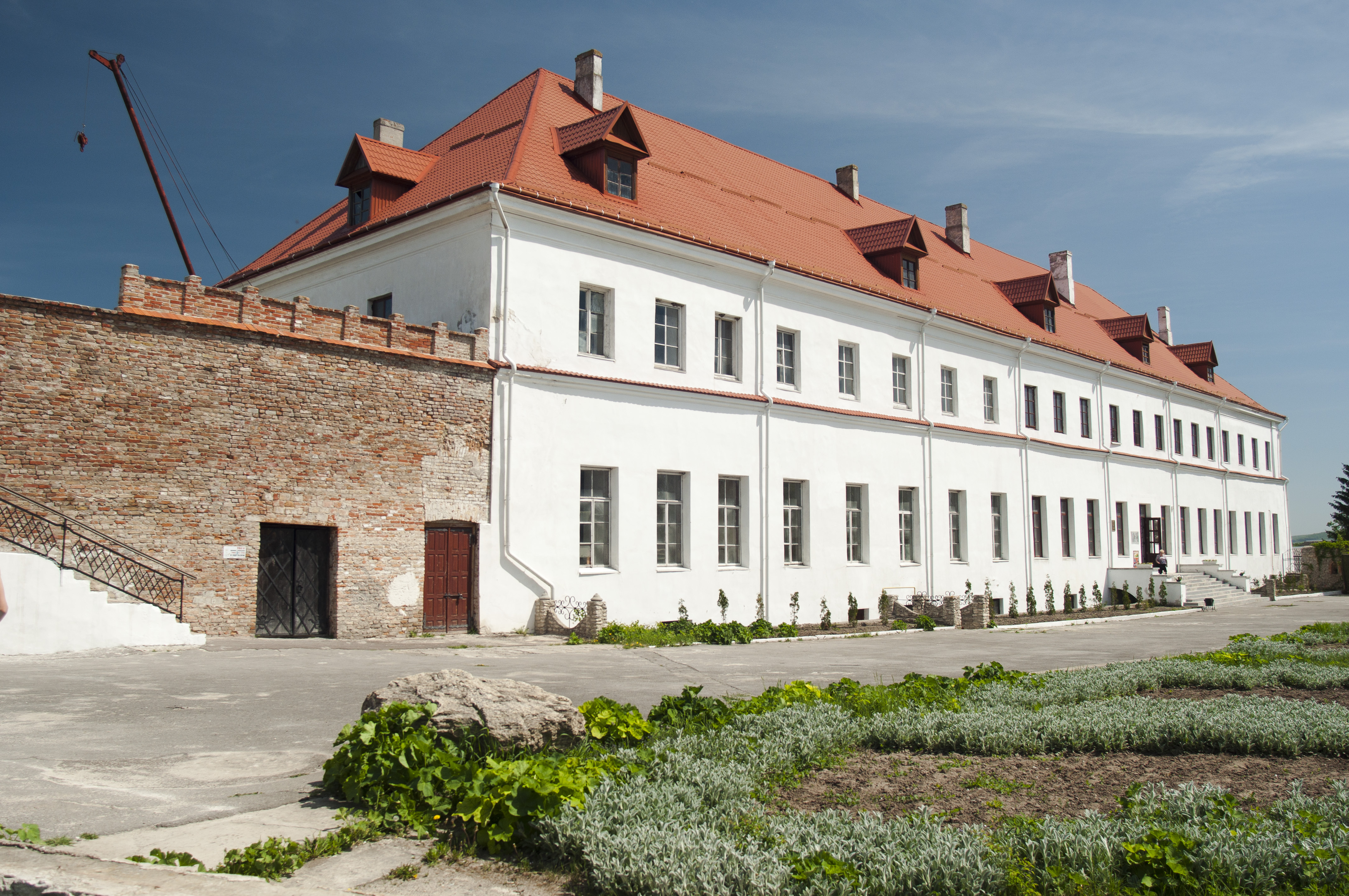
Lubomirski Palace

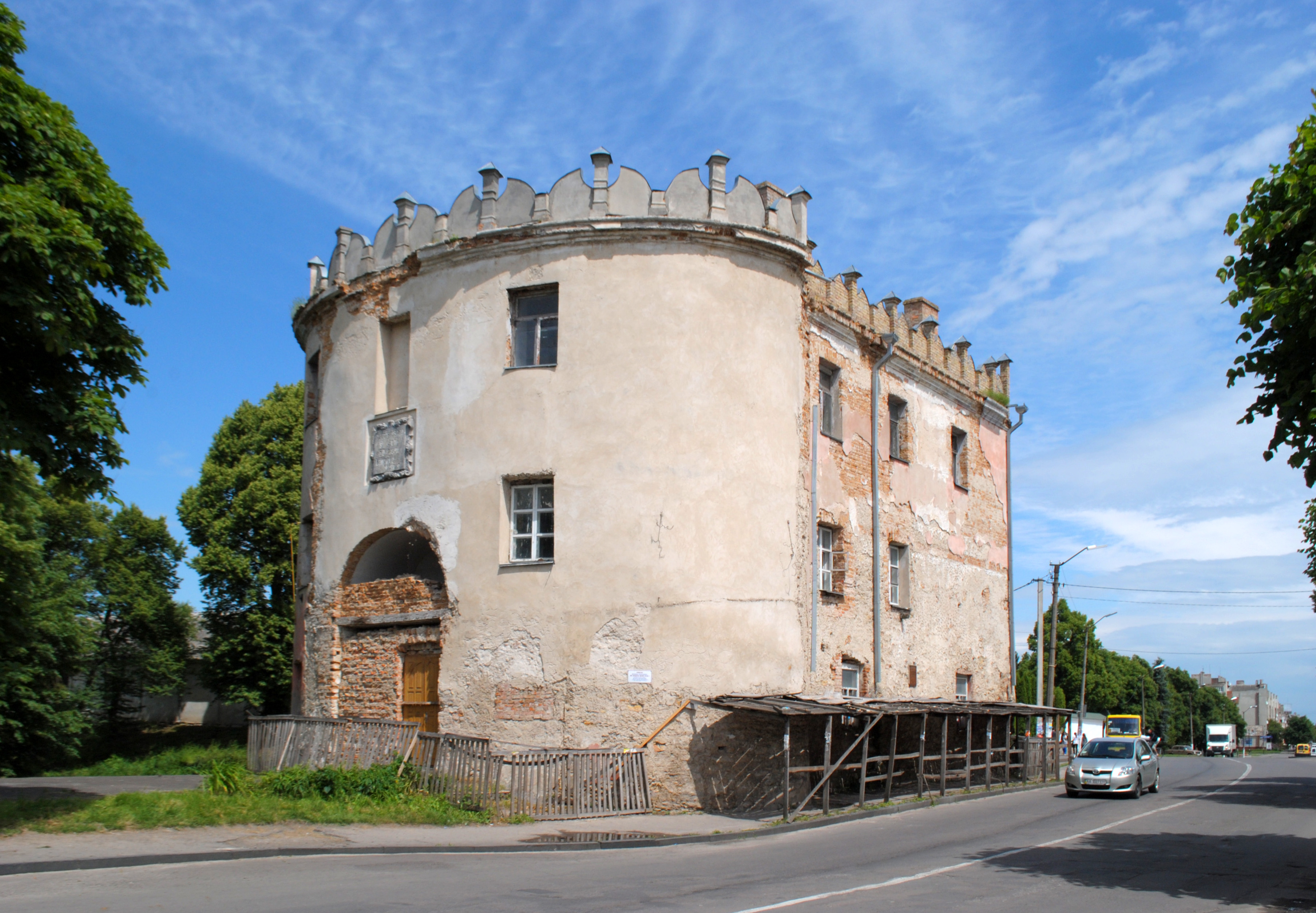
Lutsk Gate

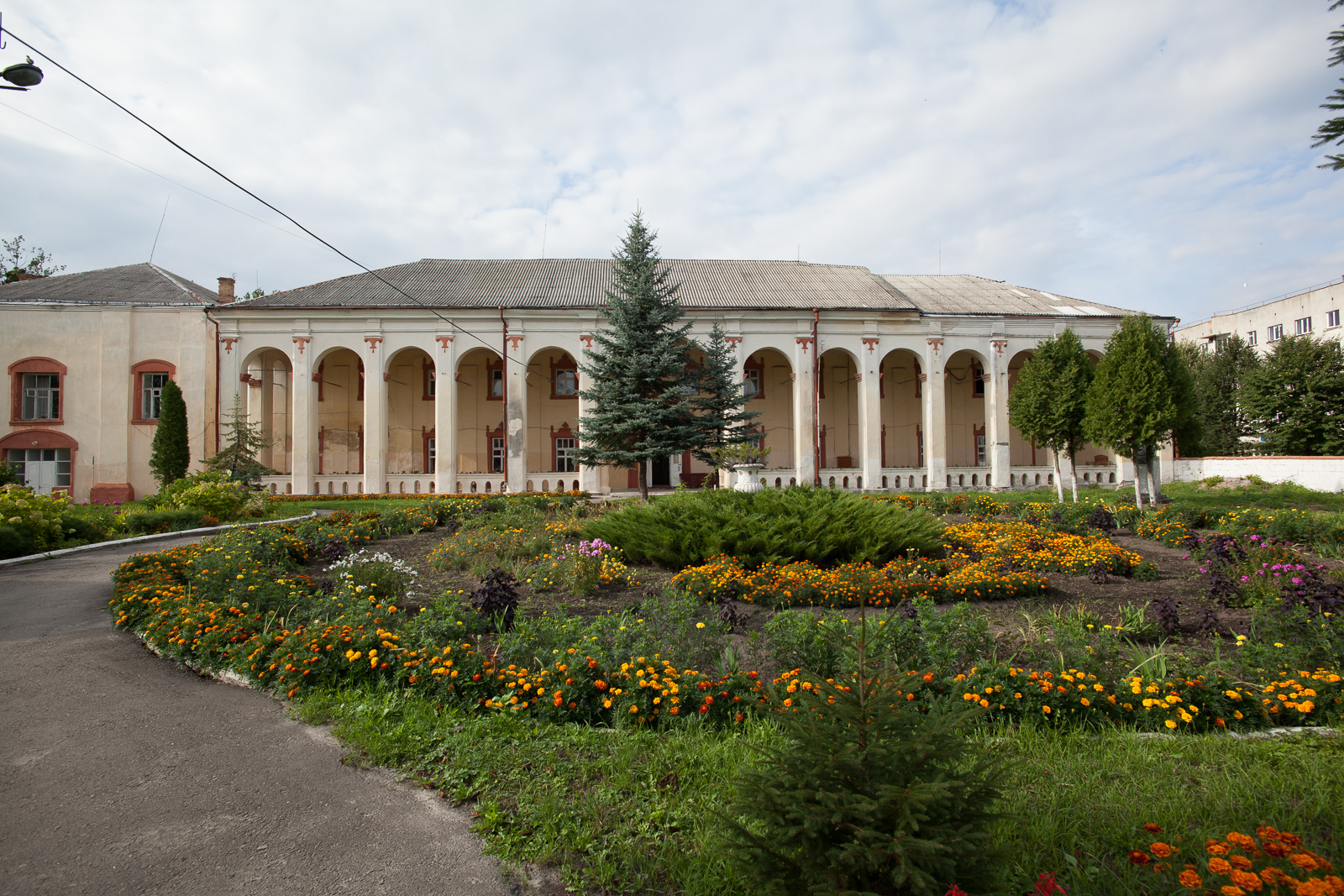
Carmelite monastery

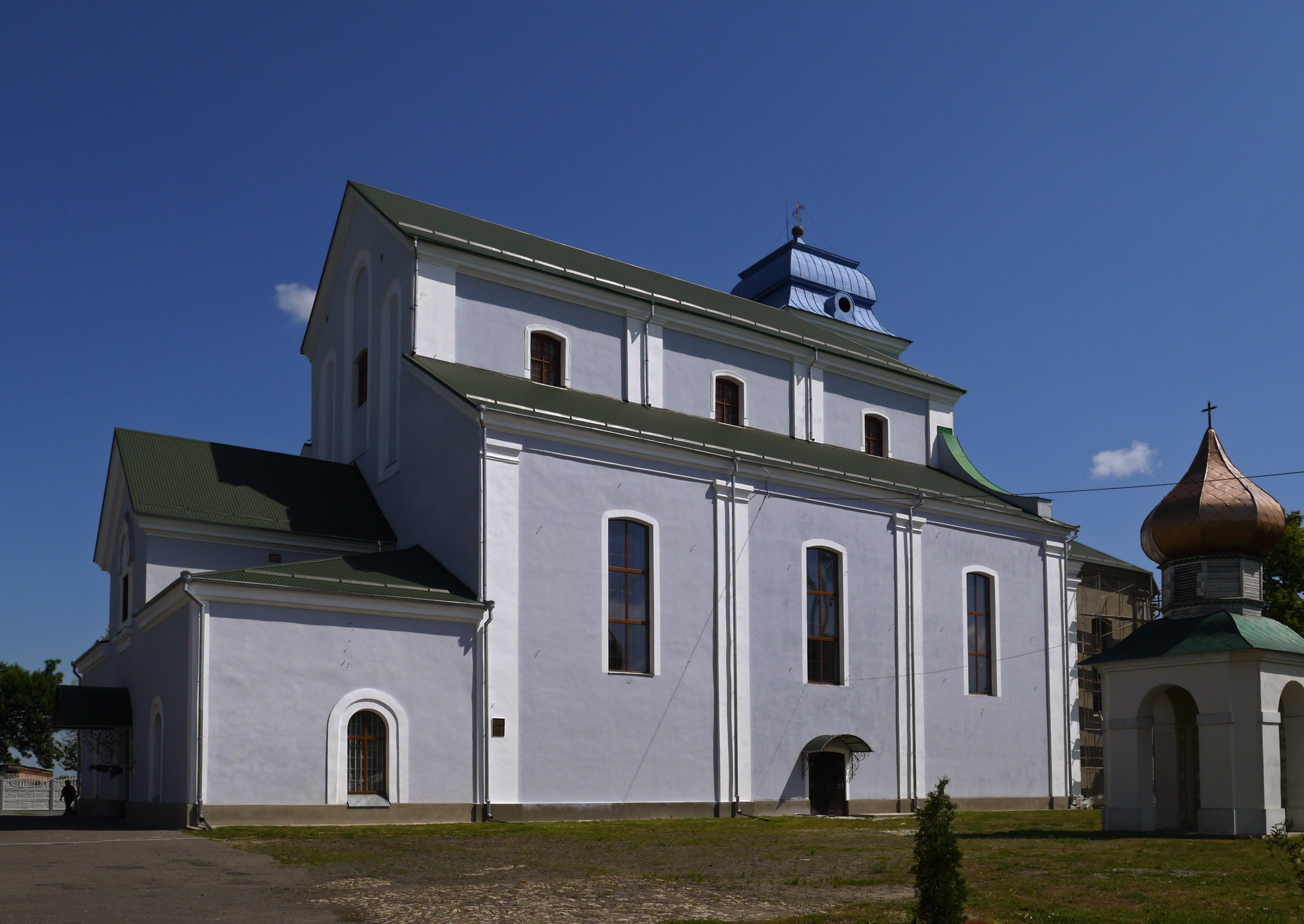
Bernardine Monastery

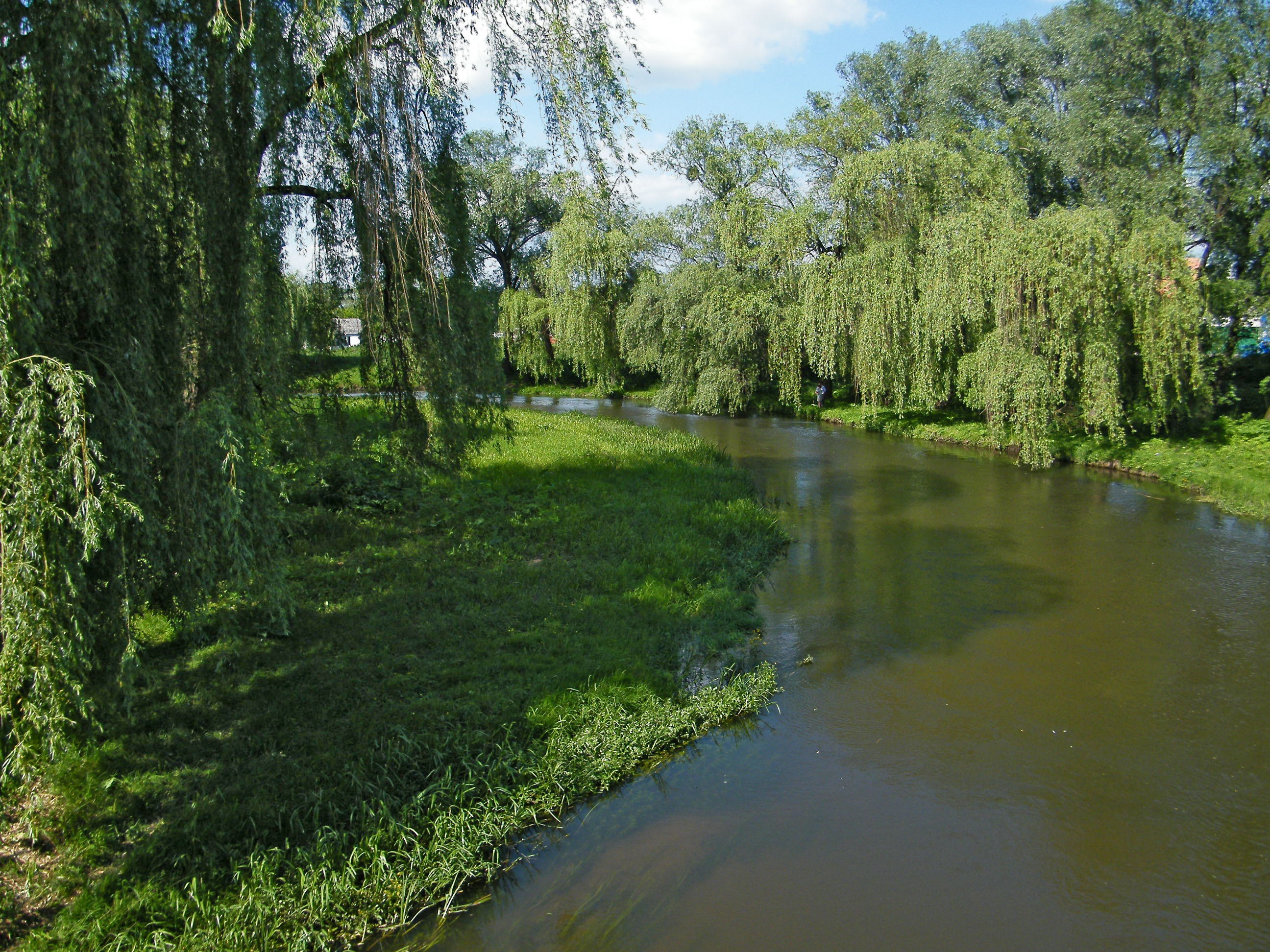
Ikva River in Dubno

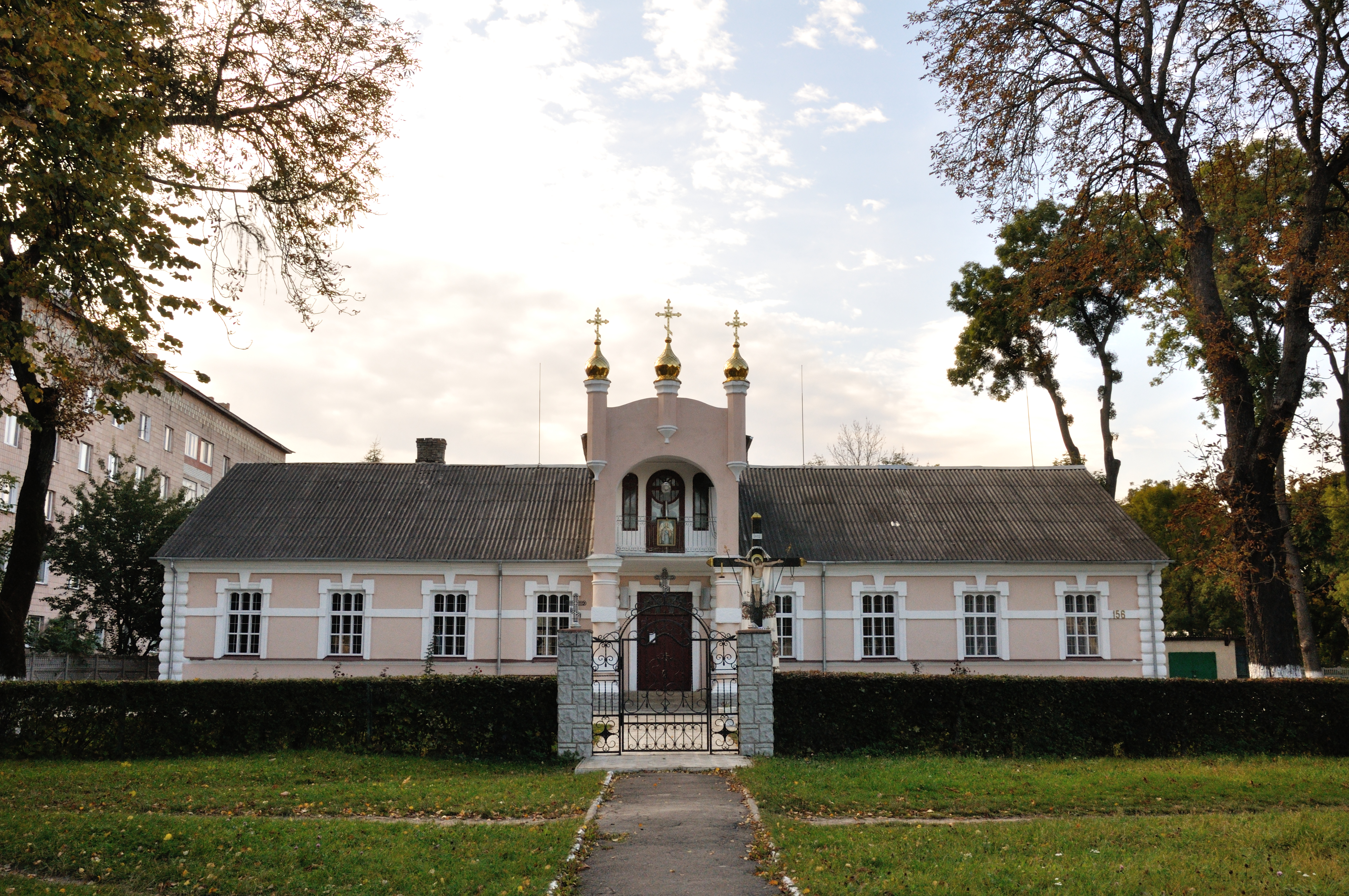
Dombrowski manor

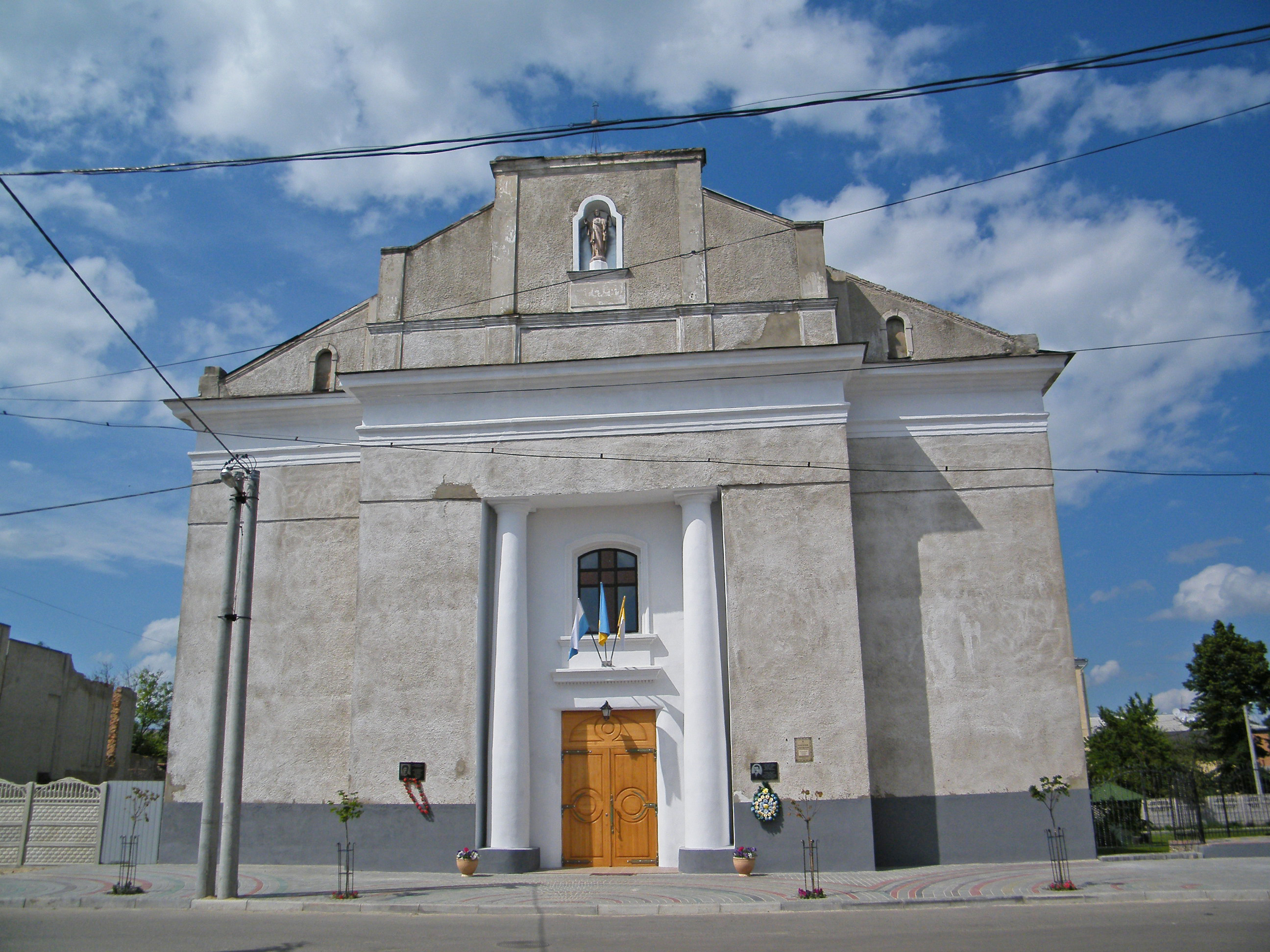
Church of Saint John Nepomuk

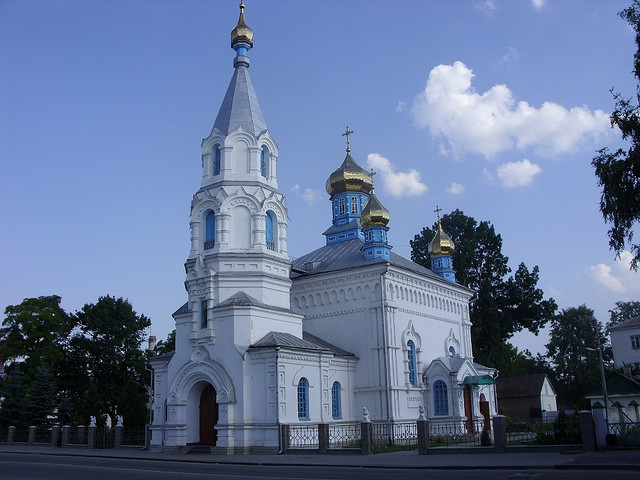
Saint Elijah church

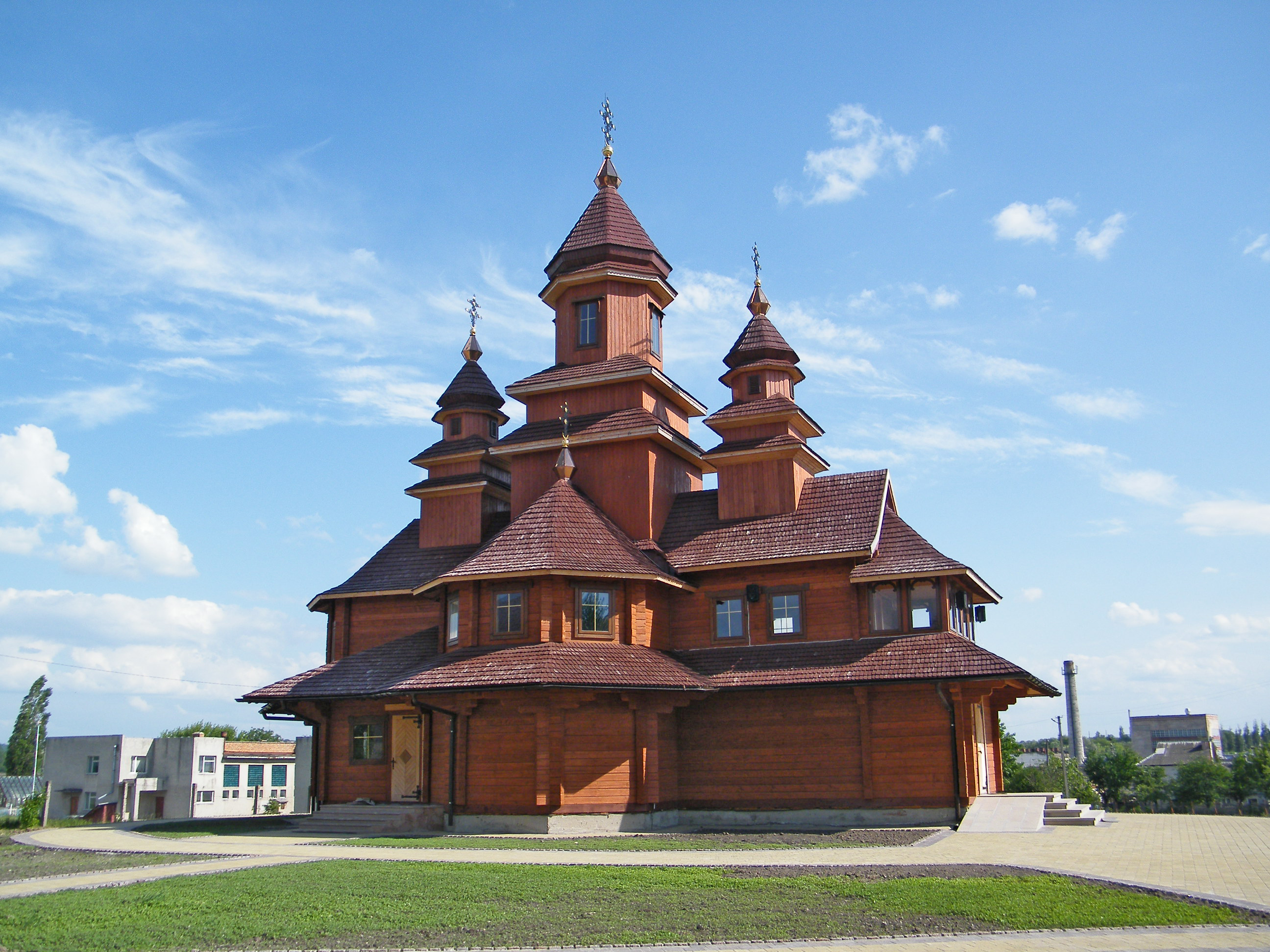
Church of the Ascension

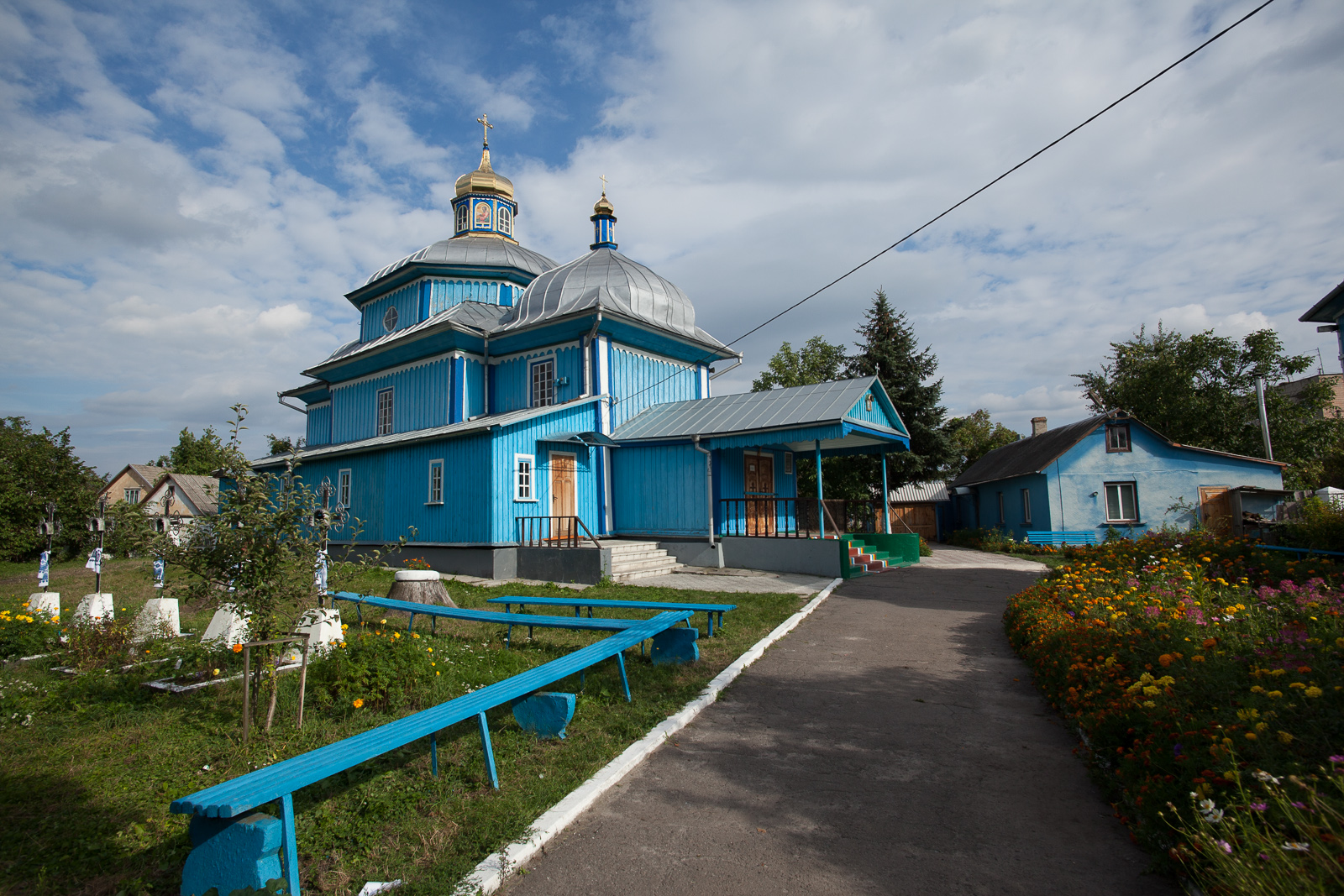
Saint George's Church

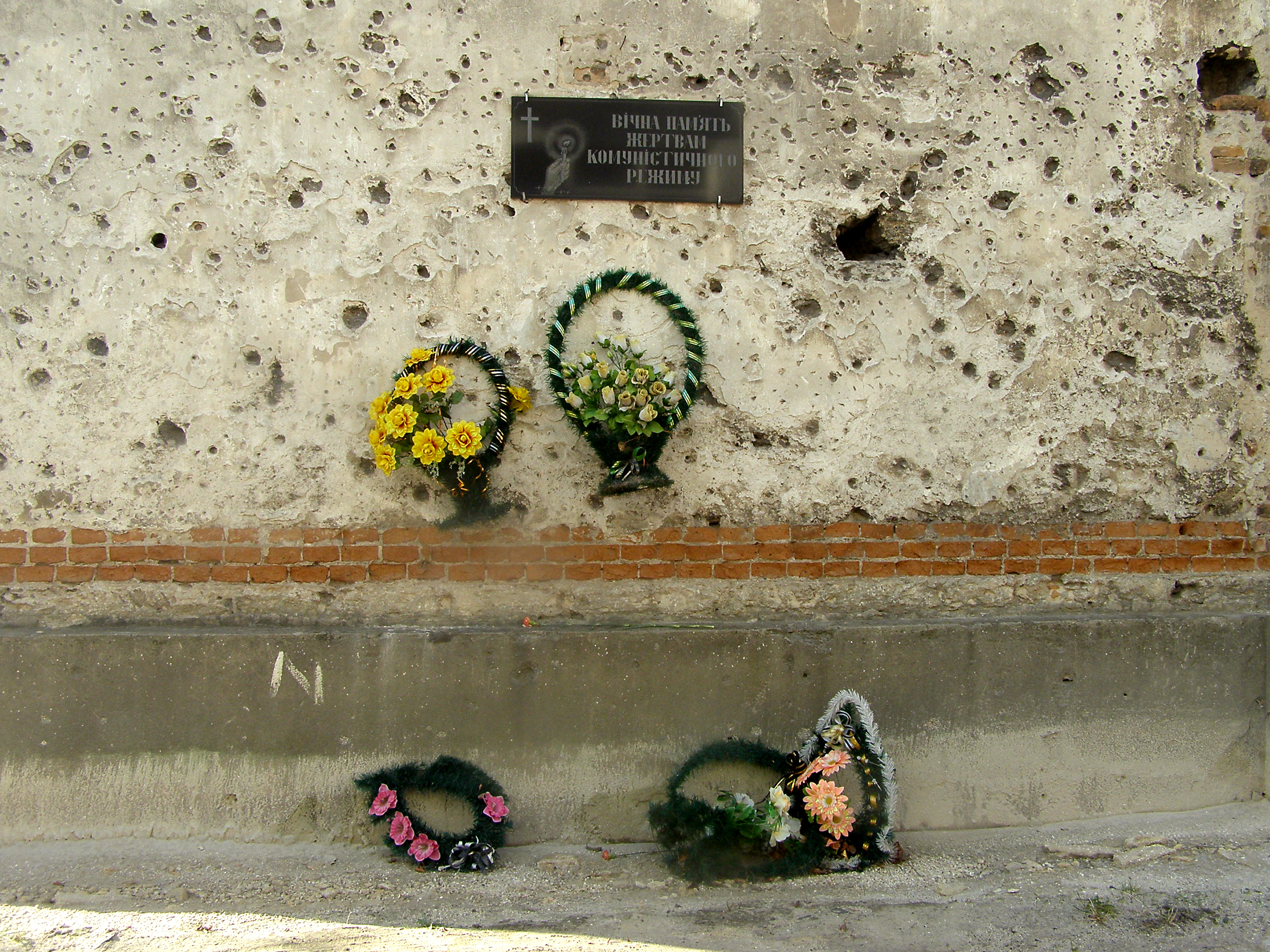
Memorial to the victims of Communist regime

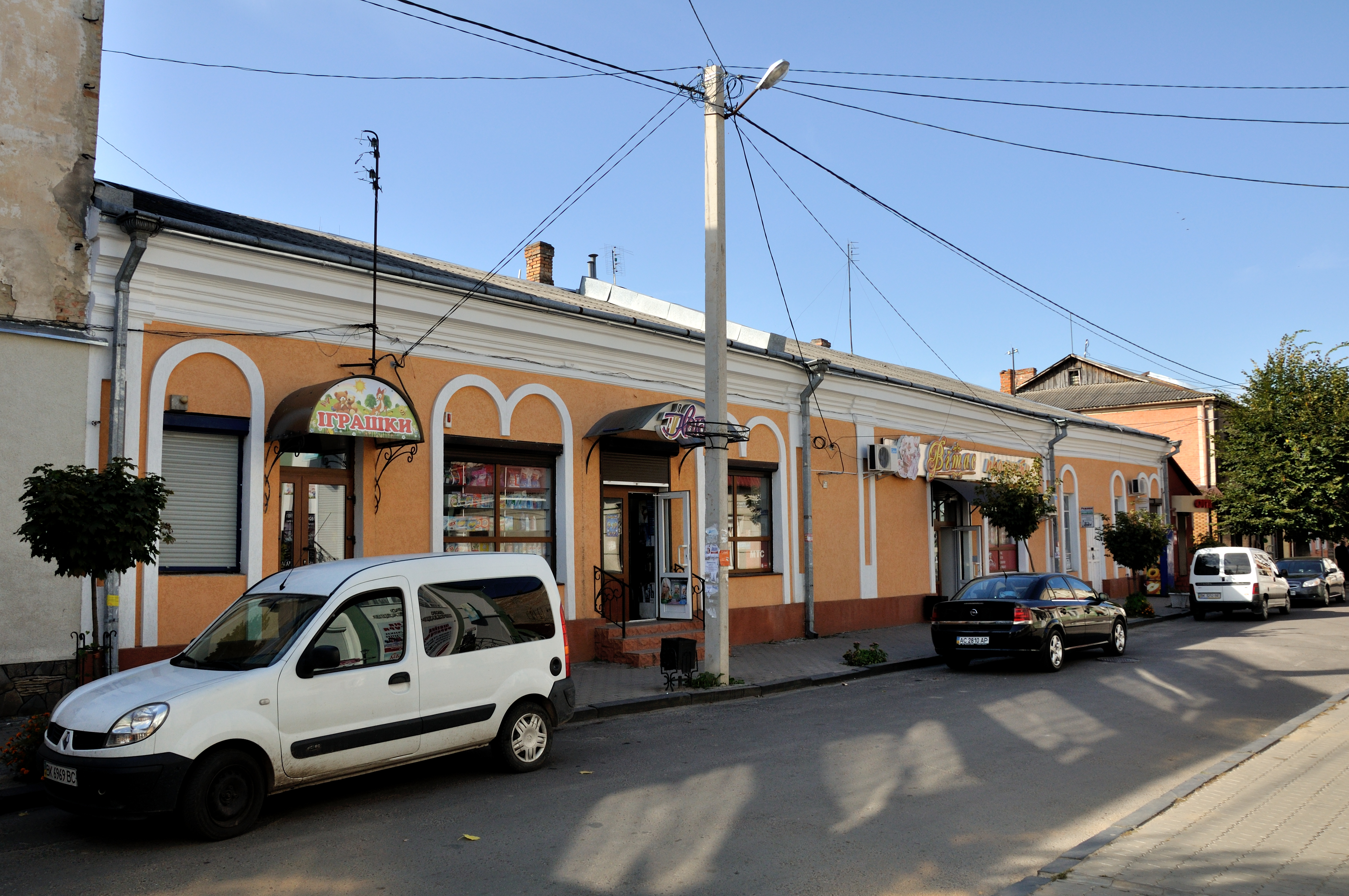
Merchant's house

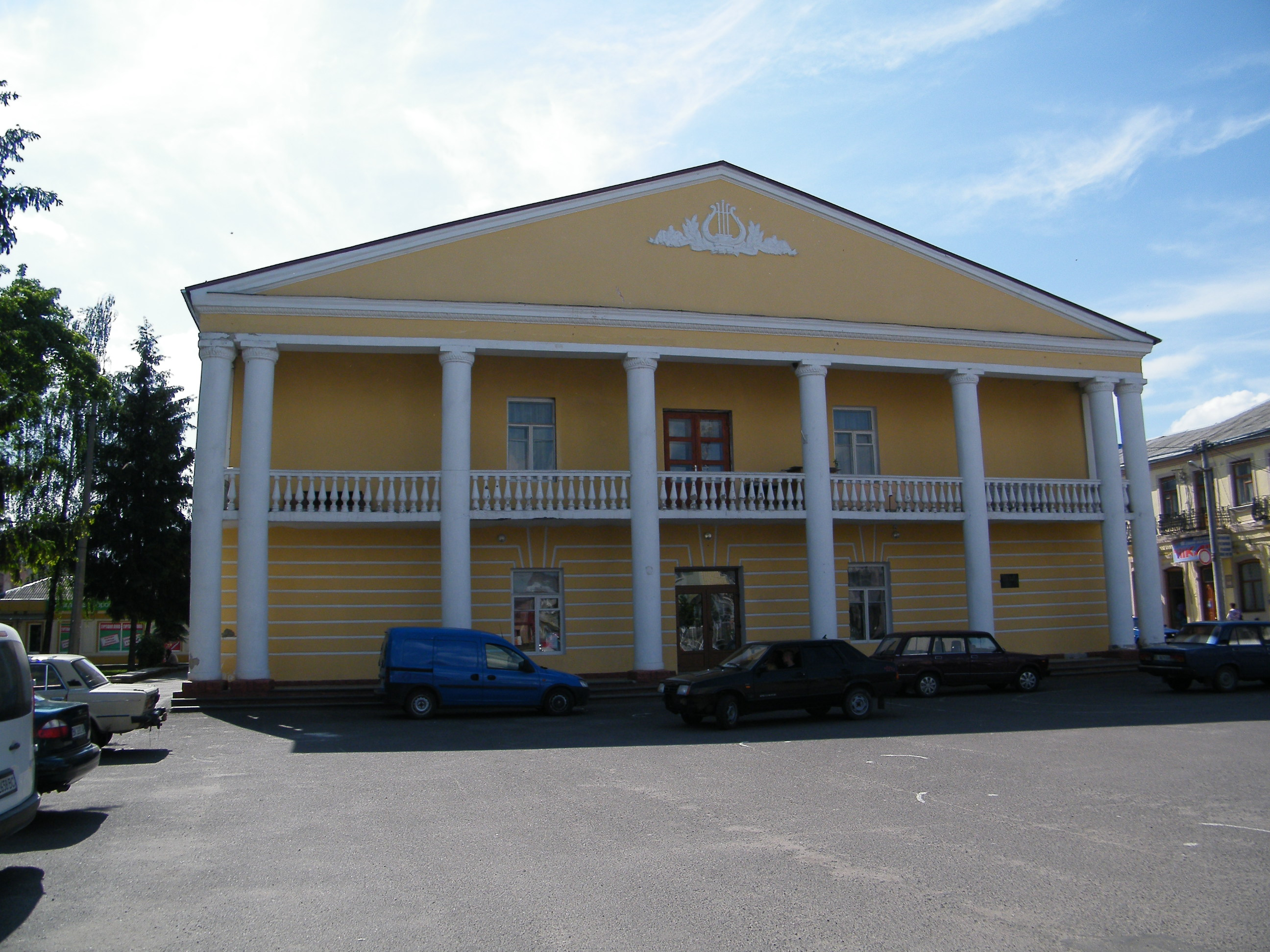
House of contracts

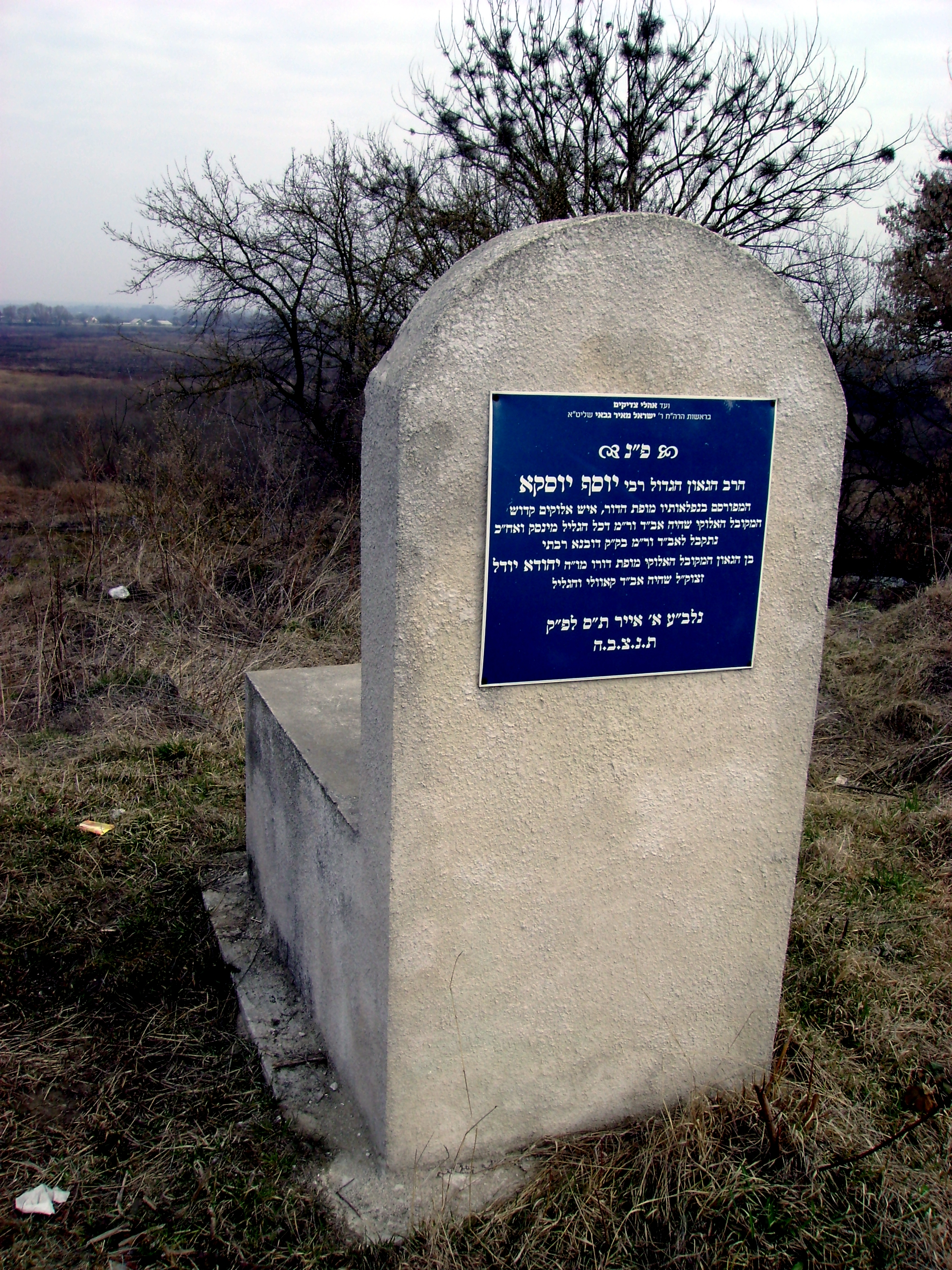
Grave of Yosef Yaakov (Yoska) Sabatka

== People ==
- Yosef Yaakov (Yoska) Sabatka, Rabbi Yosef, Rabbi of Dubno
- Jacob ben Wolf Kranz, Dubner Maggid
- Axel Freiherr von dem Bussche-Streithorst
- Rafał Leszczyński (1650–1703)
- Aleksander Dominik Lubomirski
- Józef Karol Lubomirski
- Katarzyna Ostrogska (1560-1579)
- Stanisław Skalski, Polish fighter ace of the Polish Air Force in World War II, Brigadier General, participant of the Battle of Britain
- Wiktor Poliszczuk
- Joseph Soloveitchik
- Vyacheslav Ivanovich Zof
- Roman Toporow

== International relations ==
=== Twin towns — Sister cities ===
Dubno is twinned with:

- Czerwionka-Leszczyny, Poland
- Giżycko, Poland
- Sokołów Podlaski, Poland
- Oxford, Ohio, United States

== See also ==
- List of towns with German town law
- Battle of Warsaw (1920)
- Polish-Soviet War
- Polish-Soviet War in 1920
- German XLVIII Panzer Corps
- Operation Spark (1941)
- Taras Bulba a book in which Dubno plays a large part
