= Márkus Horovitz =

Hungarian rabbi and historian

Rabbi Markus Horovitz
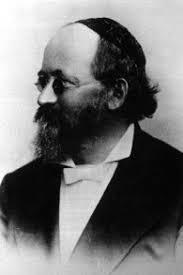
- Rabbi Márkus Horovitz
- Title: Rabbi

Personal life
- Born: 5 March 1844 Ladány (Tiszaladány), Borsod-Abaúj-Zemplén County, Kaisertum Österreich
- Died: 27 March 1910 (aged 66) Frankfurt am Main, German Empire
- Children: Josef Horovitz
- Notable work(s): Zur Geschichte der jüdischen Gemeinde in Eisenstadt, Frankfurter Rabbinen, Jüdische Ärzte in Frankfurt a. M., Matteh Lewi, Die Wohlthätigkeitspflege bei den Juden im alten Frankfurt, Die Frankfurter Rabbinerversammlung vom Jahre 1603, Die Inschriften des alten Friedhofes der israelitischen Gemeinde zu Frankfurt a. M.
- Education: University of Tübingen
- Known for: Promoting coexistence between Orthodox and Reform factions in Frankfurt
- Occupation: Rabbi, Historian

Religious life
- Religion: Judaism

Senior posting
- Post: Rabbi of Lauenburg (1871–1874); Rabbi of Gnesen (1874–1878); Rabbi of Frankfurt am Main (1878–1910)

Markus Horovitz (Hungarian: Horovitz Márkus, 5 March 1844 – 27 March 1910) was a Hungarian rabbi and historian.

== Biography ==
He was born at Ladány (Tiszaladány), Borsod-Abaúj-Zemplén County, Kaisertum Österreich. The descendant of a family of scholars, he pursued his rabbinical studies at the yeshivot of Ujhely, Verbé, and Eisenstadt (the latter under the direction of Israel Hildesheimer). He studied (1868–71) philosophy and Orientalia at the universities of Vienna, Budapest, and Berlin, taking his PhD degree at Tübingen. In December 1871, he was called as rabbi to Lauenburg in Pomerania; in 1874, to Gnesen, Prussian Posen; and in September 1878, to Frankfurt am Main. At Frankfurt he organized two model religious schools. Horovitz was a director of the Deutsche Rabbinerverband and president of the German Jewish orphanage at Jerusalem. He was the father of Josef Horovitz and the ancestor of the journalist David Horovitz.

== Conflict and career ==
Horovitz was rabbi in Frankfurt at a time when the disagreements between the Orthodox and Reform factions were reaching their peak. Horovitz was appointed to chair a committee on ritual to placate the Orthodox followers of Samson Raphael Hirsch, who were threatening to found a separate community, the Israelitische Religionsgesellschaft ("Religious Society of Israelites"). He was given authority over the entire community's religious institution, and promoted the construction of a new Orthodox synagogue on the Börneplatz, which was dedicated on 10 September 1882. Horovitz promoted coexistence between the different factions, maintaining that it was possible for a unified community to exist while both sides exercised autonomy over their own institutions.

Horovitz died in Frankfurt in 1910. He was buried in the Old Jewish Cemetery, Frankfurt.

== Writings ==
Besides numerous sermons, and essays on the origin of the Hungarian Jews (in Izraelita Közlöny, 1869), Horovitz published the following works:

- Zur Geschichte der jüdischen Gemeinde in Eisenstadt [On the history of the Jewish community in Eisenstadt], 1869
- "Jose ben Jose," in Jüdische Presse, 1873
- Frankfurter Rabbinen [Frankfurt rabbis], 4 parts, Frankfurt am Main, 1882–1885
- Jüdische Ärzte in Frankfurt a. M. [Jewish doctors in Frankfurt am Main], 1886
- Matteh Lewi [Levi's Guide], a work in Hebrew on letters of divorce, Frankfurt am Main, 1891
- Matteh Lewi [Levi's Guide], a work in Hebrew containing rabbinic responsa, Frankfurt am Main, 1933
- Matteh Lewi [Levi's Guide], a reprint of work in Hebrew containing rabbinic responsa, Jerusalem, 1972
- Die Wohlthätigkeitspflege bei den Juden im alten Frankfurt [On charity work among the Jews in old Frankfurt], 1896
- Zur Statistik der jüdischen Bevölkerung im alten Frankfurt [On statistics of the Jewish population in old Frankfurt], 1896
- Die Frankfurter Rabbinerversammlung vom Jahre 1603, 1897
- Die Inschriften des alten Friedhofes der israelitischen Gemeinde zu Frankfurt a. M. [Inscriptions at the Old Cemetery of the Jewish community in Frankfurt am Main], 1901
  The last work depicts gravestones and inscriptions at the old Battonstraße cemetery, and has, since the destruction of the cemetery by the Nazis, become a vital historical document.

== Resources ==
- "Horovitz, Markus", by Aron Freimann and Isidore Singer, Jewish Encyclopedia (Funk and Wagnalls, 1901–1906)
- "Horovitz, Markus ", Infobank Judengasse, website of the Museum Judengasse, branch of the Jewish Museum Frankfurt
- Digitized works by Markus Horovitz at the Leo Baeck Institute, New York
