= Zaslavsky =

Zaslavsky, Zaslavski, Zaslavskii, Zaslavskiy (Ukrainian: Заславський) or Zasławski (Polish) is a masculine surname of Polish origin. The feminine counterpart (in Slavic countries) of "Zaslavsky" is Zaslavskaya or Zaslavskaia; that of "Zasławski" is Zasławska. Notable people with the surname include:

- Aleksandr Zaslavsky (born 1996), Russian football player
- Zedd (born 1989 as Anton Zaslavski), Russian-German musician, music producer, and DJ
- Claudia Zaslavsky (1917–2006), American educator and ethnomathematician
- David Zaslavsky (1880-1965), Soviet journalist
- Dora Zaslavsky (1905–1987), American pianist
- George Zaslavsky (1935–2008), Soviet mathematical physicist
- Tatyana Zaslavskaya (1927–2013), Russian economic sociologist
- Thomas Zaslavsky (born 1945), American mathematician, son of Claudia
- Victor Zaslavsky (1937–2009), Soviet political sociologist
- Ilya Zaslavskiy (born 1960), Russian politician and disability advocate
- Aleksander Zasławski (died 1629), Polish-Lithuanian noble
- Aleksander Janusz Zasławski-Ostrogski (1650–1682), Polish-Lithuanian noble
- Symeon Zaslawski and Michal Zaslawski, sons of Jaunutis (14th century), Grand Duke of Lithuania
- Teofila Ludwika Zasławska (ca. 1650 – 1709), Polish noble
- Władysław Dominik Zasławski-Ostrogski (ca. 1616 – 1656), Polish noble
- Zasławski family, Polish–Ruthenian nobility
- Max Zaslofsky (1925–1985), American professional basketball player and coach

Related pages are

- Iziaslav of Kiev (disambiguation) (11th – 12th centuries), Kievan princes
- Izyaslav of Polotsk (10th century), Kievan prince
- Hope Holiday (born 1930 as Hope Jane Zee, originally Zaslawsky), American actress

Related places:

- Iziaslav, Ukraine or Zaslav, city in Volhynia, Ukraine
- Zaslavsky Uyezd, former subdivision of Volhynia, Russian Empire, containing city of Iziaslav
- Iziaslav Raion, former district in Ukraine containing city of Iziaslav
- Duchy of Zaslawye, former territory now in Belarus
- Zaslawye, town in Belarus

== See also ==
- Zaslav (disambiguation)
