= Iziaslav =

Iziaslav may refer to:

- Iziaslav, Ukraine, a city
- Iziaslav Raion, a former raion in Khmelnytskyi Oblast in Ukraine
- Iziaslav IV Vladimirovich (born 1186)
- Iziaslav (Brutskiy) (1926–2007), primate of the Belarusian Autocephalous Orthodox Church
- Iziaslav of Kiev (disambiguation), several people

== See also ==
- Iziaslav Vladimirovich (disambiguation)
