= Zasław =

Zasław may refer to:

- Historical name for Zasłaŭje, a historic town in Minsk Province, Belarus
- Historical name for Iziaslav (also Zaslav), Ukraine
- Zasław concentration camp, a Nazi concentration camp in Zasław (now part of Zagórz), Poland
- Neal Zaslaw (born 1939), American musicologist

== See also ==
- Zaslav (disambiguation), alternative spelling
- Zasławski family
- Zaslavsky, a surname
