= Vladimirovich (name) =

Vladimirovich is a surname and patronymic name. People associated with the name include:

== Surname ==
- Iziaslav Vladimirovich
- Vysheslav Vladimirovich
- Grand Duke Kirill Vladimirovich of Russia

== Patronymic name ==
- Yuri Vladimirovich Andropov
- Nikolai Vladimirovich Zateyev
- Vladimir Vladimirovich Putin
- Vladimir Vladimirovich Nabokov
- Fedor Vladimirovich Emelianenko
- Roman Vladimirovich Yampolskiy
- Valeri Vladimirovich Bure
- Mikhail Vladimirovich Mishustin
- Vladimir Vladimirovich Mayakovsky
- Evgeni Vladimirovich Malkin
- Pavel Vladimirovich Bure
- Nikolai Vladimirovich Elizarov
- Oleg Vladimirovich Penkovsky
- Sviatopolk I Vladimirovich
- Boris Vladimirovich Gnedenko
- Alexander Vladimirovich Rutskoi
- Nikolai Vladimirovich Talyzin
