= Zaslav =

Zaslav may refer to:

- Iziaslav, Ukraine
- Bernard Zaslav (1926–2016), American violist
- David Zaslav (1960-2026), American television executive and current president of Warner Bros. Discovery.

== See also ==
- Zasław (disambiguation), an alternative spelling
- Zaslavsky, a surname
