= Zaslow =

Zaslow is a surname. Notable people with the surname include:

- Jeffrey Zaslow (1958–2012), American author and journalist
- Jonathan Zaslow (born 1981), sports radio show host in South Florida
- Michael Zaslow (1942—1998), actor

== See also ==
- Zislow
- Zasław (disambiguation)
