= Iziaslav of Kiev =

Iziaslav of Kiev may refer to:

- Iziaslav I of Kiev (1024–1078), patronymic Yaroslavich
- Iziaslav II of Kiev (1096–1154), patronymic Mstislavich
- Iziaslav III of Kiev (died 1162), patronymic Davidovich
- Iziaslav IV of Kiev (born 1186)

== See also ==
- Zaslavsky
- Iziaslav (disambiguation)
