= Bernardine Monastery, Iziaslav =

Former Roman Catholic monastery in Iziaslav, Ukraine

St. Michael and Bernardine Monastery
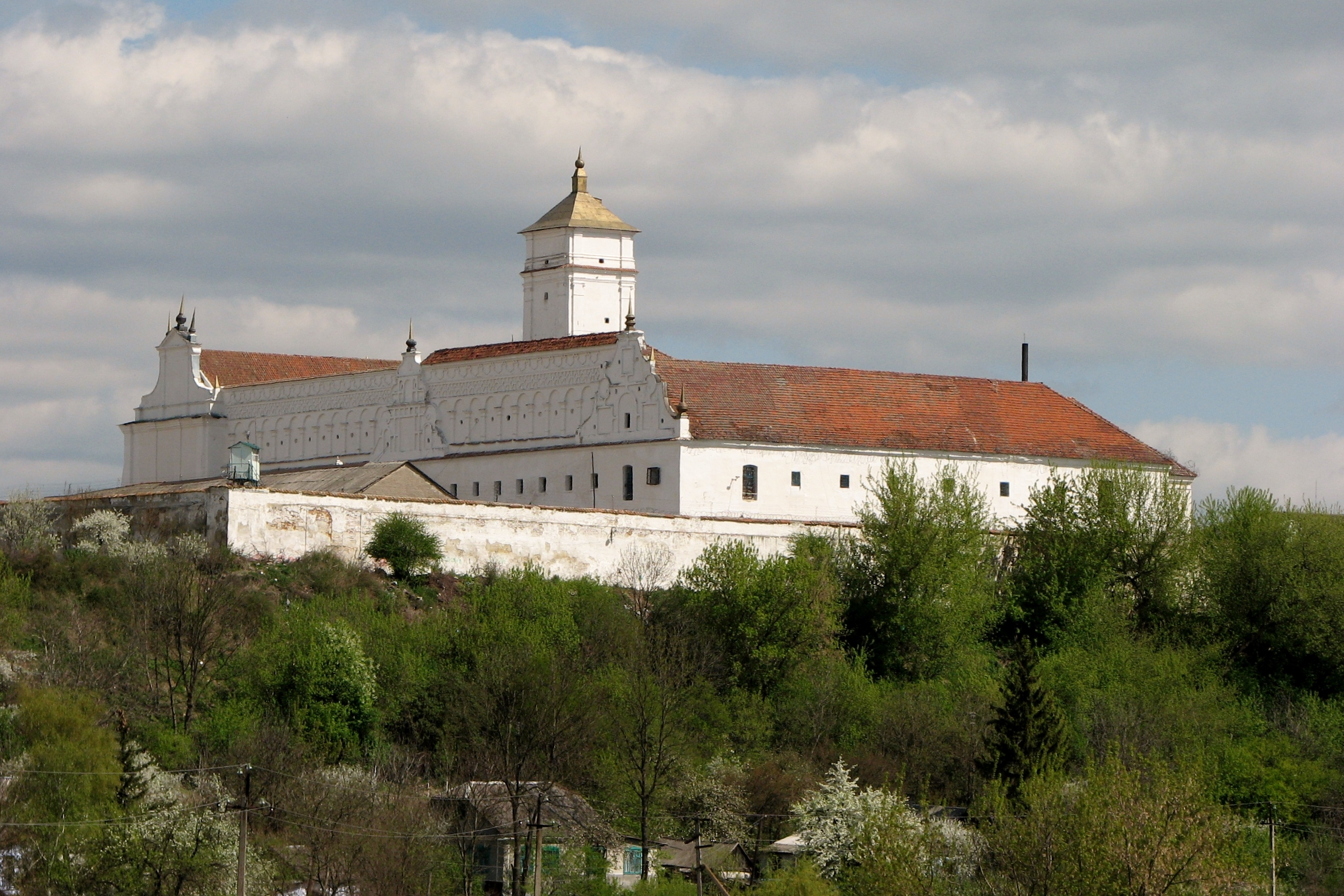
- The monastery from the southwest

- Location within Ukraine

Architecture
- Status: Active
- Architect: Jakub Madlain, Bernard Avelides
- Completed date: c. 1630

Site
- Location: Iziaslav
- Country: Ukraine
- Coordinates: 50°07′34″N 26°48′53″E
- Public access: no

The Monastery of St. Michael and Bernardine is a former Roman Catholic monastery complex in Iziaslav, Ukraine, that was built in the early 17th century. The complex is used as a prison, Zamkova Correctional Colony No. 58. The buildings are an example of Baroque architecture in Ukraine.

Between 1797 and 1815, the Bernardine monastery was the main residence of the Ruthenian province of the order.

The monastery is in the Old Town section of the town on the high left bank of the Horyn River. The complex includes a stone monastery church, a bell tower, chapels, and outbuildings. The grounds once included a cemetery, a garden, a pond, and a garden. The monastery was surrounded by a high wall containing loopholes and gates.

== Location ==
The Bernardine monastery is located in the northeast part of Iziaslav, Ukraine, on the Horyn River. The monastery formed part of the defenses of the former city. The monastery, the Church of St. John the Baptist, and the Cathedral of the Nativity (formerly the castle church), form the central square of the Old Town. Being the largest building complex within Iziaslav's architectural heritage, it occupies one of the highest sections and dominates the town.

== Background ==
The period between 1550 and 1650 is considered the "Golden Age" of the Polish–Lithuanian Commonwealth (formed in 1569 by the union of the Kingdom of Poland and the Grand Duchy of Lithuania). It was a period of economic prosperity due to the grain trade. Foreign trade in grain occupied a key position in the trade conjuncture of the Zaslav region, the leading role in the market held by the owners of the property princes (knyaz) Zaslavsky. The grain collected from the Volyn holdings was transported to Gdańsk or another port from where it was sold to the Netherlands, England, France, Italy, and Spain. The construction of the monastery complex in Zaslav was taking place at the same time as the implementation of another rather costly project – the construction of the church of John the Baptist. It was also a time of religious tolerance as a result of the decisions of the Warsaw Confederation (1573), but also the time of Catholic counter-reformation. At the time of the allotment of the land for the construction of the Bernardine monastery, Prince Janusz Zasławski professed Calvinism, and his wife, Alexandra Sangushkivna, belonged to the anti-Trinitarians. Their son Prince Alexander Zaslavsky, a Catholic, who had a conflict with the Bernardines, completed the construction of the monastery. Zaslav was a multinational (Ruthenians, Hebrews, Poles, Tatars) and a multi-denominational (Orthodox, anti-Trinitarian, Calvinist, Greek Catholic, Catholic, Jewish, Muslim) city. During this period, new trends in architecture and urban planning were introduced on the Ukrainian lands, introduced by visiting European construction workers, mostly Italians. The erection of the complex of the monastery in the newest style of Mannerism and Late Renaissance lights is associated with the construction activity in the exile area of architect Jakub Madeline, originating from Graubünden, land on the Italian-Swiss border.

== Early years and destruction ==
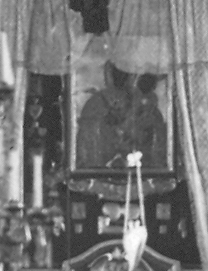
The image of the Zaslav Mother of God, the central element of the main altar

According to a Roman Catholic source, Prince Janusz Januszkiewicz Zaslavsky in 1602 undertook the construction of a monastery for the Order of Bernardines "Abandoned Orthodox Chapel" of the Baptist Church " which "from ancient times" belonged to the treasure of Prince Zaslavsky. Most probably, it was about the construction of a Roman Catholic shrine on the site of a former Orthodox monastery, the Holy Trinity Monastery, which was already in decline by the time of unknown life changes. Information on the construction of the monastery and its church is unknown to modern researchers and possibly not preserved. The mention of 15 July 1622 informs us that the building of St. Michael's Church has just begun to be vaulted. Therefore, we can assume that from the time of the fundus, by the time the walls of the church were already extinct, had been 18 years.

It took so long to build, and in particular to architect Jakub Madeline, to first prepare and then undertake such grand construction. In general, the construction of the complex lasted until 1630, since the construction of the monastery was included in the city defense system of Old Zaslav on the ground side (from the north).

It is during this period that historians date the western facade of the monastery building with its attic and typical Mannerist pediments preserved to this day. It is likely that architect Bernard Avelides was involved in the planning of these forceps. In addition, the modern appearance of the monastery can be seen on the map from the 18th century, where the four-tiered tower draws special attention.

With the beginning of the Cossack rebel under the leadership of Hetman Bohdan Khmelnytsky, the icon of the Zaslav Mother of God was evacuated to the Bernardine monastery in Rzeszów. Meanwhile, the Cossacks and Kholops, having seized the city, plundered and destroyed the monastery, which in a deplorable state lasted for almost 80 years.

== Reconstruction ==
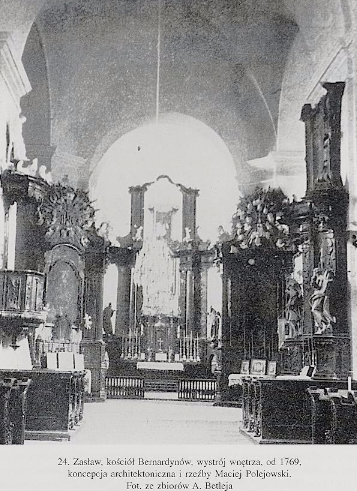
The main altar

With the help of Paul Karl Sangush in 1727 the revival of the monastery began. This process took several stages. Researchers identify the so-called "First Reconstruction" (1753–1754), during which the building of the monastery underwent significant changes, and the church was re-closed. The carver Dominic Katsevich made for the church an altar of St. Joseph. In 1753, the name of Zaslavsky architect Paolo Fontana was mentioned in connection with the installation of scaffolding around the monastery. However, the broader scope of its activities in this area is not allowed by available sources.

During the Second Reconstruction (1759–1775) the monastery was renovated. The naves and side chapels were given a variety of artistic decoration. In 1763, a carver from Annopol, Jan Push, was involved in the work on temple altars. However, he did not manage orders due to a sudden death. Thus, in 1765, a contract was signed with a representative of the Lviv School of Sculptors Józef Sztyl. The following year, the church was re-stained, new windows were installed, altars, walls and pediments were painted. In 1766–1767, the old organ was dismantled, and a new choir was built according to the sketch of Brother Bernardine Artemisia Brown from Chudnov, and a new organ of Mikhail Sadkovsky's work from Lviv was installed only in 1772 (already in 1776, the organ had to be repaired).

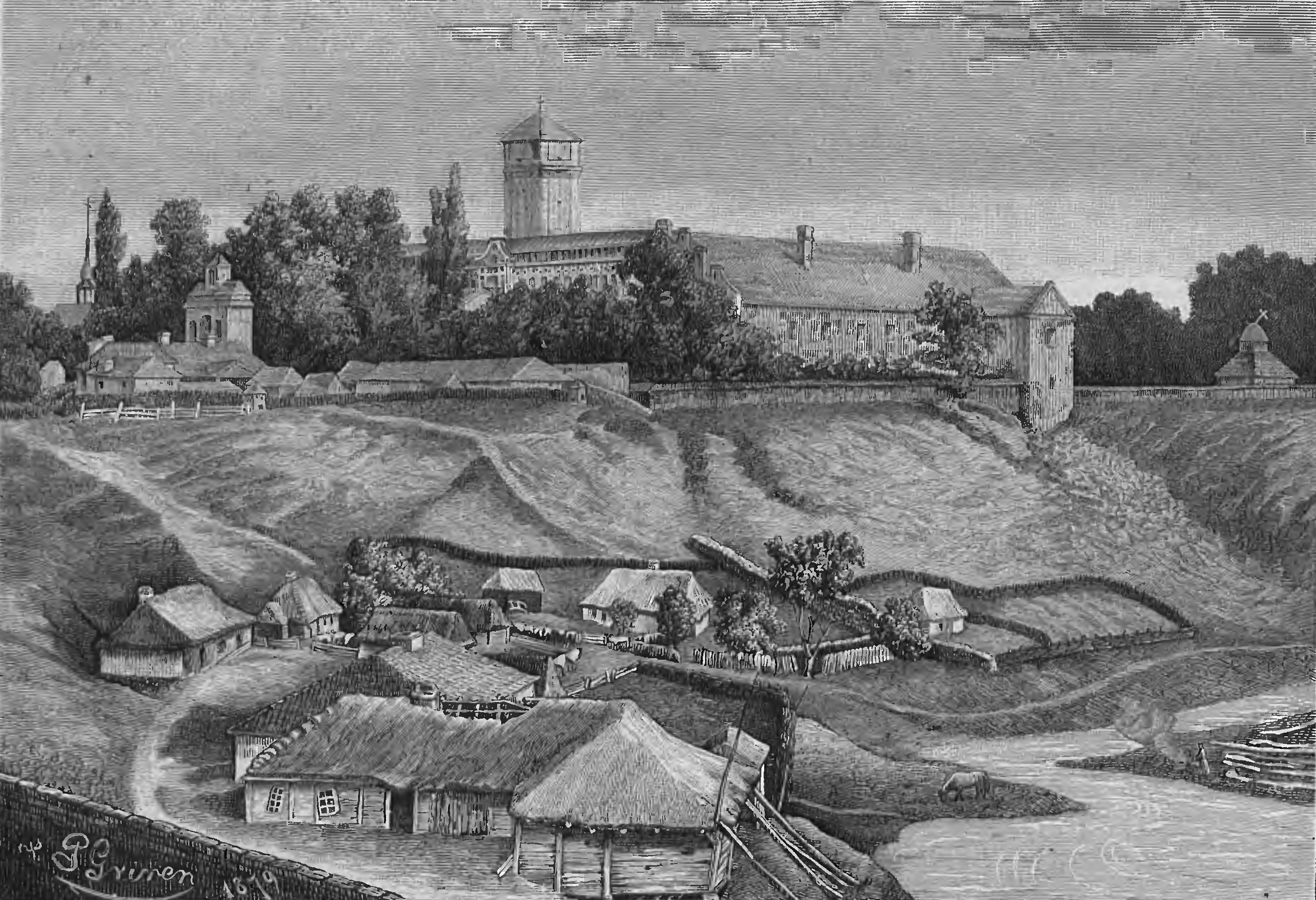
View of Bernardine Monastery (Illustration from the magazine "Tygodnik ilustrowany". 1881)

To equip the church during the period of 1766–1770, eight works of the outstanding 18th-century painter Szymon Czechowicz were purchased, in particular: St. Francis, St. Tadeusz, St. Onuphrius, St. Caetan, St. Vincent, the Transfiguration of the Lord, "St. Michael the Archangel", "St. Thecla", "St. Joseph" and "St. John of Nepomuk".

In 1768, a contract was signed with another representative of the Lviv School of Sculptors, a pupil of Pinzel, Matthew Poleyovsky. In the beginning, the eminent master contributed to the appearance of the ciborium, ambon, and carving of the main altar. In 1773, Paleyovsky arrived in Zaslav to develop a new structure for the main altar of St. Michael's Church, Saint Roch's and St. Thecla's altars. He returned to Lviv in November 1774, not completing the works and leaving two of the five apprentices to continue the work. Also involved in the work of the choir was Dnos Markwart from Horodyszcze, who at the same time produced pulpitis and a small crucifix. Along with masters from other cities, such Zaslav masters as Berek Yosevich, Josip Mashkevich, Yuri Khmilevsky worked on the church and the monastery. In June 1775, with a large crowd of worshipers, celebrations were held to mark the transfer of the image of the Mother of God of Zaslav to the main altar, as well as the crucifixion "surviving from the first foundation". At the same time, the altars of St. Francis and St. Onuphrius were immortalized to bring the St. Valentine's relics from Rome.

During the 1778–1780, the "third reconstruction" of the monastery took place. Josef Legerlutz von Janow carved sculptures of saints Michael, Anthony, and Francis on the façade. In 1782 new bells were purchased. The last recorded in the sources of improvement date back to 1789, Michel Charles once again repaired the organ.

From 1740, the monastery had studios of philosophy, theology, and rhetoric.

The Monastery Library numbered about 5,000 volumes, including many rare editions.

There were chapels of Saints Anne, Anthony and Francis at the monastery.

From 1797, the monastery became the main residence of the Ruthenian province of the Immaculate Conception of the Blessed Virgin Mary, until its forced merger with the Lithuanian Province in 1815.

=== Notable burials ===
Traditionally, burial was carried out in the crypt of the church. In addition to the founders, Janusz and Oleksandra Zaslavsky, other members of the Zaslavsky family were buried in the monastery: Karol, Francis, Susanna, Euphruzin, Oleksandr and Konstyantyn. Burial in the monastery walls were also honored by representatives of the Order: Casper Pratsky, a missionary killed in a martyr's death in Muscovy; Marian Shumsky, initially imprisoned and later tortured by Muscovites for his missionary activities in 1620; brother of Tomasz, killed by the Cossacks in 1622; his brother Didak from Sambir, killed by the Tatars in 1624 and his father Lukash from Drohobych, an exemplary catechist.

== Decline during the 19th century ==
In the 19th century, the Bernardine friars from Zaslavl owned a folwark with arable land and hayfields, a mill and stood in the village of Horodyshche, apiary in the Black Vine tract.

As a result of the policy to weaken the Roman Catholic Church in 1841, by order of the Russian authorities, the monastery was transformed into a "full-time 2-class", its clergy were cut off extremely, and its educational activities were abolished. At the beginning of the 20th century, Zaslavl monastery oo. Bernardine de jure was the only operating monastery of the Order within the Lithuanian-Russian province, although de facto did not exist. In the monastery's buildings, with the permission of the Russian government, there was novitiate for the united orders of Bernardine and Capuchin fathers, one for the entire Lutsk-Zhytomyr diocese. The monastery was used for penitentiary purposes. Catholic priests were sent here with the consent of the diocesan authorities for atonement or rest. Among those who were exiled at that time were Anthony Linevich, Felix Lubchinsky, Marian Tokazhevsky, Maximilian Turovsky, Ilya Andrushkevich. The last Zaslav Bernardine friar died in 1910.

== Closure during the Soviet period ==
With the outbreak of World War I, Bernardines were able to return to Volhynia. In 1914, the monastery already had three friar and two priests. Until 1915, the duties of administrator of the monastery were performed by Gustaw Jełowicki (1880-1965).

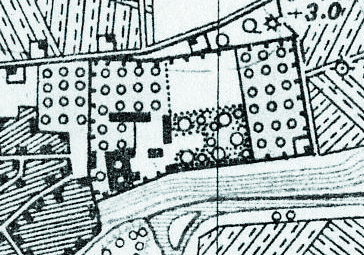
Map of the territory of the monastery (fragment of the city map 1938)

After the Soviet occupation, the Shepetivsky house of forced labor (hereinafter referred to as Izyaslavsky BUPR) and the Special Department of the Сheka were stationed in the monastery buildings.

In 1930, the Bernardine Fathers Monastery was inspected by a commission of the Volyn State Research Museum composed of Antonov (head of Art Department) and Ilyuchenko (head of History Department). At that time, the BUPR was located in cells of the monastery, which had just begun to be liquidated, and only 20 people were in prison. However, the building of the monastery has already been overlooked by the COOPTAH (poultry cooperative) and the Kushnir Artel. No towers around the monastery existed at that time (there were three as of 1926), despite the fact that museum officials warned the local administration against their destruction. Many of the things from the monastery were taken to the museums of Shepetivka and Kyiv. Finally, in the case of saving the unique cultural complex, the Museum Commission reached the following conclusions:

1. The former Bernardine monastery, along with all the surrounding buildings, the church, and the garden, should be retrained as a monument of architecture;

2. Protect it from the destruction that could happen with it in the case of transfer to the COOP or the Kushnir Artel;

3. To stop the further export of things of cultural, historical and/or artistic value from Zaslav and its surroundings;

4. Establish a local history museum in the premises of the former Bernardine monastery;

5. Return to the museum all previously taken exhibits;

6. To put on the museum the function of protection of monuments of culture and art of Zaslavl region.

However, subsequent events testified to the futility of the museum's hopes.

The last Bernardine friar left the city in 1932, having previously organized the export to Poland of the archives and libraries of the monastery, as well as parts of the equipment.

== Architecture ==
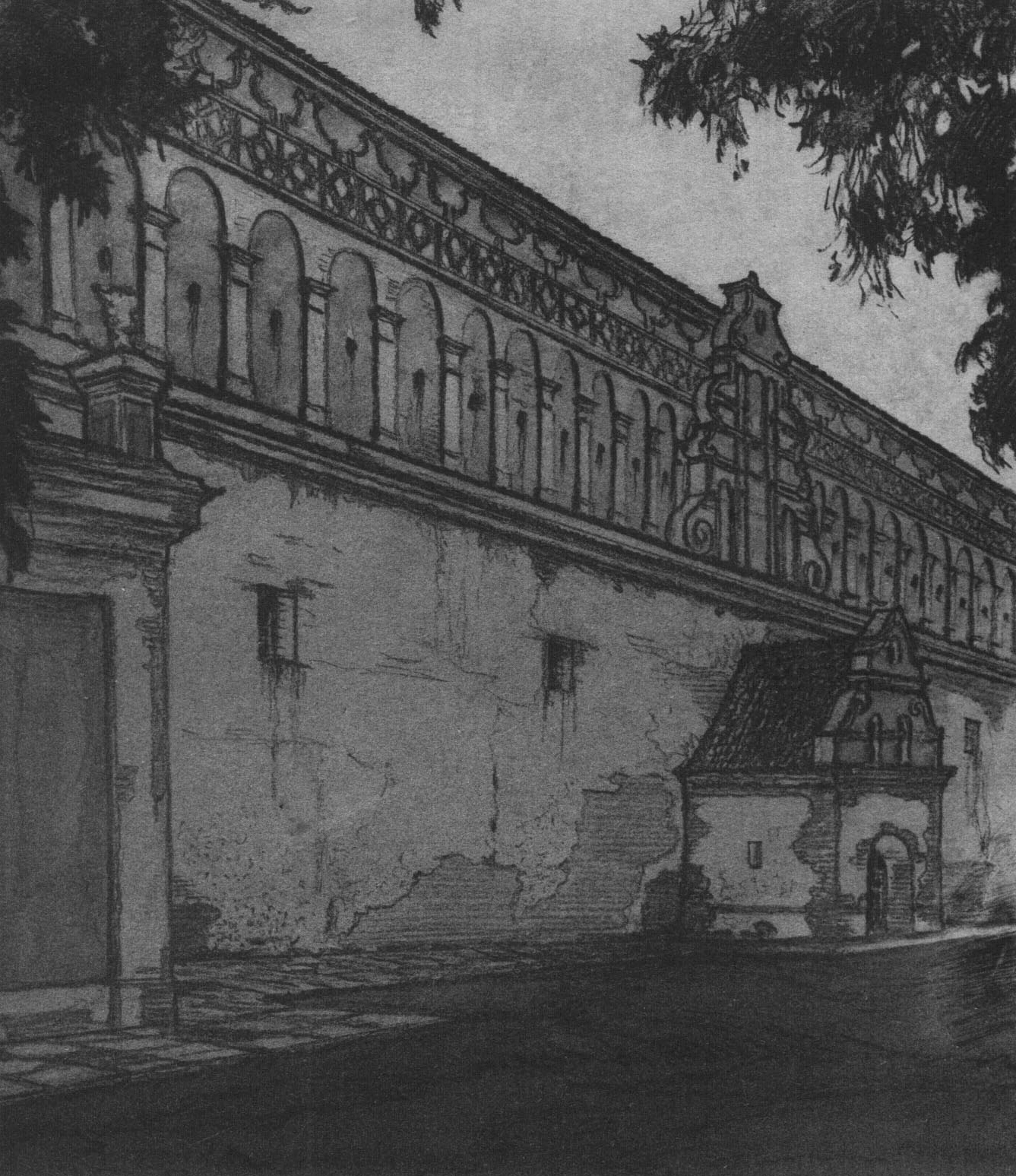
Western facade of the monastery with a vestibule (George Loukomski. 1910)

St. Michael's Church is a one-nave temple on the Latin planning cross, at the expense of the transept, to which a square tower in the projection of the south adjoins. The altar part has a granular solution. The shrine overlap is vaulted. The roof is made of tile. The temple is illuminated through windows. The entrances to the church are to the west and east (through the tower). To the west is a narthex, above which is an open gallery, adorned with wrought-iron lattices, fixed on brick columns, the entrance to which is located from the choirs. The temple is decorated with eaves, unbuttoned on the blades. The western façade is performed by a mannier pediment, decorated with volutes, pilasters and advanced eaves. The transept from the north is decorated with a gable with an arcade, from the south with floats.

The temple is decorated with eaves, unbuttoned on the blades. The western façade is performed by a manier pediment, decorated with volutes, pilasters and advanced eaves. The transept from the north is decorated with a gable with an arcade, from the south with floats.

The building of the monastery is combined with the church into a single architectural ensemble, adjacent to the temple from the south. It is a brick two-story building occupying an area of 67 × 37 m and forms two cloisters. The three-sided south cauldron is surrounded by galleries. On the east facade there is an Avant-corpse formed by the monastery dining room. On the pictures of the 1950s, one can also see the avant-corpse on the south facade, crowned with a triangular pediment, later dismantled in connection with the adaptation of the structure for new needs. The third tier was defensive. It included a breast wall with loopholes, preserved on the facade from the west, decorated with armature, pilasters and ornamental friezes. In the center of the western facade there is a tall manner pediment, decorated with arched and rectangular niches, volutes. A similar, but otherwise decorated, pediment is also located on the west facade near the southwestern corner of the structure. The building is illuminated through windows. The roof is made of tiling. The entrances are arranged from the south, east and west through the gables with pediments. The most interesting is the one-tier vestibule of the western entrance with the most elegant manneristic pediment.The eastern entrance is decorated with the relief of the coat of arms of the Sanguszko.

Ostrog Gate played the role of the main gate of the monastery from the northwest. Now the remains of the walls of the first tier are included in the prison fence from Gagarin Street. In stylistic terms, it belongs to the works of architect Paolo Fontana and recalls his other works: the belfry of the parish church in Ostrów Lubelski and the bell tower of Bernardine church in Jelenec. In the lower tier there was placed spacious entryway with annexes on the sides. In the upper tier there was a room illuminated through rectangular windows. The building was covered with a tiled roof with a dormer. The nares are emphasized by pilasters.

== Protection of the monument ==
The problem of protecting the architectural complex of the Bernardine monastery arose immediately after the former owners lost complete control over it and placed it in part of its premises at BUPR. It was one of the most acute cultural problems in the Shepetivka district as early as the mid-1920s.

During 1926, the former monastery was visited three times by Fedor Ernst, the local inspector of the Kyiv Regional Inspectorate for the Protection of Cultural and Art Monuments, and Danilo Shcherbakivsky, the member of the Presidium of the All-Ukrainian Archeological Committee. Thanks to their efforts, the complex was taken under special protection by the People's Commissariat of Education of the USSR as a monument of national importance. In particular, the following objects were protected: the part of the monastery that was used by the religious community (the building of the church of the beginning of the 17th century, the tower, closed adjoining corridors, the wall in front of the church, the house to the left of the entrance gate, the so-called palace chapel, the bell tower to the right of the entrance gate, the dome pavilion with the crucifix in front of it, the tombstone between the palace chapel and the church); part of the former monastery, which was adapted to the needs of Shepetivsky BUPR (all facade and interior walls, yards, corridors, cells, stairs, dining room (reception), annex near the courtyard corridor, wooden carved doors near all doors). Also, the Kyiv Regional Inspectorate for the Protection of Cultural and Art Monuments guarded the premises of the former monastery dining room, ornaments and whitewashed murals on religious subjects in the cells of a former monastery etc... The BUPR administration was undertaken to keep the listed facilities and surrounding gardens in proper condition without disturbing their appearance.

Instead, the BUPR administration, contrary to the Regulations on the Protection of Cultural and Nature Monuments, approved by the VUZVK and the RNA of the Ukrainian SSR on 10 June 1926, actively reorganized the premises and adapted them for their own needs. They also seized new premises that were not used by the religious community. As a result of the activities of the prisoners, the greatest damage was done to one of the finest-saved monasteries in Ukraine at that time. The walls between the monastic cells were destroyed, the masonry of the main walls was broken, a "huge hole was punched" in the former dining room. The work was carried out by prisoners in violation of construction technology, «smoke from the chimneys penetrated went through the wooden floorboards into the corridors of the second floor». Without any obvious need, gardens were cut down around the monastery, including age-old trees. In this regard, several unsuccessful attempts were made to alienate the monument on the use of BUPR. In 1931, the People's Commissariat of Education of the Ukrainian SSR joined the case of the protection of the monument. But despite all the efforts of the monuments, the former Bernardine monastery was finally transformed into a prison.

By resolution of the Council of Ministers of the USSR of 24 August 1963 № 970 a complex of monuments ("Bernardine church, cells, walls with gates and towers"), located in the territory of the Iziaslav prison, under № 760 was taken under the protection of the state.

St. Michael's Church and Monastery of Bernardines is listed in the State Register of National Cultural Property (monuments of town planning and architecture), security numbers of the complex 760 0–760 3, which also includes "walls with gates and towers".

On 23 September 2008, the complex was added to the list of non-privatizable cultural heritage monuments.

Remaining a monument in a penitentiary institution makes it impossible to take an inventory of its current state of research. It is known that fragments of 18th-century murals have been preserved in the building of the former monastery.

== Use as a prison ==
=== Cheka ===
Since the early 1920s, the monastery complex was occupied by Soviet invaders. Shepetivsky BUPR (hereinafter referred to as Izyaslavsky BUPR) and a Special Department of the Cheka-GPU are located in the monastery buildings. The so-called "troika", an out-of-court sentencing organ, met directly in prison.

Such memory of the formation of the logic of the Red Terror in the Bernardine monastery was left by the peasant P. Tymchyk from the village Dvirets:

Slippery mold in the corners of the prison, cold and wild. We, the arrested, are kicked out of the cells and forced to undress. High Jew walked around us and for fun hit the ramrod on his bare backs. During the interrogations, we were starved to death and beaten. It is remembered back in 1930. Every night, Jew Telishevsky was taken out of the cell by one of the arrested and shot. We heard gunshots, death cries.A heart trembled, tears fell from eyes. The question is: what are the sufferings for? Are we criminals? Are we, gray workers, enemies of the people? »

The Iziaslav prison of the Red Terror era was also reflected in the poetry of the Ukrainian poet Mykola Bolkun.

On the eve of the German-Soviet War, experiments were conducted in the walls of the prison, and toxic and psychotropic drugs were tested. With the onset of the German offensive, NKVD staff and officers escaped by leaving "patients" at the mercy.

=== Gestapo ===
During the German occupation of 1941–1943, the complex of the former Bernardine monastery was used by the Gestapo. In particular, members of the Zaslav anti-Nazi group, Mykhailo Masheruk, were imprisoned, some of whom were tortured, some were shot.

=== Iziaslav Children's Labor Colony ===
After the war, a labor colony for about 200 "juvenile offenders" was located in the monastery walls. In reality, these were the children of the "enemies of the people." Since 1954, the labor colony has been a secret site, reporting directly to Moscow.

On 6 December 1956, a secret order of the Ministry of Internal Affairs of the USSR discussed the situation in the so-called children's colonies of the USSR. In particular, it was noted that in the Iziaslav camp in the last year there were recorded cases of images and beating of weak teenagers, confiscation of food, belongings, and money from them by the colony workers. During the year, the camp was covered by riots and mass protests by prisoners.

Until 1958, the head of the supervisory service of the Iziaslav Children's Labor Colony of the Ministry of Internal Affairs in the Khmelnytsky region was Alexey Devyatov, one of the executors of mass shootings of Polish POWs in the Putivl camps in 1940.

MX 324/58 Correctional Institution, founded in 1960, became known throughout the USSR in a short time as one of the most severe criminal prisons. Until 1965, the prison was used by Soviet special services to carry out secret executions of political prisoners.

«This camp has a long history and has been one of the most lawless in the Union. It was told that a person's life was worth a pack of cigarettes and a pack of tea. The authorities were destroying the dissenters by bribing the other prisoners, through a deliberate misconception that caused a big fight and massacre. At the same time, they constantly terrorized prisoners by imposing disciplinary penalties, for example. confinement to the solitary isolator. Therefore, people were spiritually broken and began to cooperate with the administration, or seriously ill, and then did not cause any interest in the leadership.»

– recounts one of the former prisoners in Iziaslav.

In 1972, during excavation work, a treasure was found in the territory of the former monastery, which consisted of church utensils: gold bowls, silver trays, medallions, pendants, gold chains, plates, crosses with precious stones. Subsequently, the treasure was taken to the capital of the USSR, Moscow.

It is known that dissidents Petro Saranchuk, Serhiy Babich, Olexiy Murzhenko, Leonid Schreyer were in captivity at different times. The last two were released from prison only in 1987, four years before the collapse of the USSR.

«I saw the faces of the prisoners of this camp. – Olexiy Murzhenko mentioned. – However, to say – saw the face, then to say nothing. It was a dream come true – like having a horrible, fantastic dream like Goffman's or Goya's Capriccio. We walked through the courtyards, a monastery in front of us; to the right of two hundred meters, was a two-story brick building, surrounded by a metal fence about two meters high. Behind this lattice stood there was a long bench of people in striped robes. As I later learned (though I guessed right away), they were prisoners "on the way to a сorrection", for which they were kept in an open barrack. Such privilege is possible after serving a third of the term. Other captives were held in locked cells. I was full of curiosity waiting for the meeting. At that moment, by my feelings, I was obviously very close to the pioneers, the great travelers of Miklouho-Maclay, Marco Polo or Livingston!! What kind of land are they, and who and who they are? What to expect from the upcoming meeting? And here the boat touched the bottom, the traveler goes ashore and slowly, embarrassingly goes towards the crowd of natives. He already distinguishes their faces ... Here are the first faces of the prisoners who fell into the lattice. They seemed strange to me. I thought it was stokers who threw coal in the fire in the firebox and went out to look at the stage. But here I go and see the same as if covered with coal dust, burned with fire, exhausted by the forced labor of the face.

<…> I was stunned to go on and see all the same masks, as if from a horror movie. These masks did not have individual uniqueness, these strange faces were like one mask. I could only notice the common features inherent in all the prisoners behind the metal bars: the rough, the inanimate, and not just the inanimate, but as if intimidated and lost – their features did not radiate the inherent personality of a normal person of spirituality, but aroused in imagination only teddy bears. »

=== DEC 58 – Monastery ===
Due to the horrific conditions of detention and cruel treatment of prisoners, the institution of the Ukrainian penitentiary system Castle Correctional Colony № 58 (names in the criminal world: Monastery, White Swan) is permanently mentioned in human rights and media discourses. It is said that the pubs of the former monastery have a cell and 64 single cells, as well as 62 cells in the former stables, which created incompatible conditions with health and life. Consequently, it triggers protests from convicts who develop into conflicts with the prison administration [45]. At least two similar situations of pressure and coercion of convicts in parliamentary and presidential elections are known. However, in 2007, the conflict went beyond the prison, causing inconvenience in using mobile communication for residents of the entire city. In 2008, in the building of the former church of St. Michael, the parish of the Virgin Mary "Desperate Last Hope" was founded.

In July 2009, the protest of prisoners against the horrific conditions of detention and abuse was repeated. On 1 July 2010, the European Court of Human Rights ruled in the case of «Davydov and Others vs Ukraine». The Court found that in the period 2001–2002 there were four violations of Article 3 of the Convention (prohibition of torture and ill-treatment), Article 8 § 1 (right to respect for correspondence), Article 13 (right to an effective remedy), Article 34 (right individual complaints), as well as the inability to provide the necessary conditions for the hearing of the case, in accordance with Article 38 § 1 (a), concerning persons who at that time were serving sentences in PEC № 58. The case of Davydov and Others vs Ukraine has revealed one of the most egregious human rights abuses in Ukraine. It is a question of working out of fighting skills by militia special units of the Ministry of Internal Affairs of Ukraine on persons serving sentences in prisons.

Following the abolition of the death penalty in Ukraine, Sector No. 58 created a sector for holding more than one hundred life-long prisoners. Pastoral work with convicts and employees of the colony is carried out by the UGCC chaplains.

== Literature ==
- Tokarzewski M. Z kronik zakonnych kościoła i klasztoru oo. Bernardynów w Zasławiu na Wołyniu. — Warszawa, 1913. (in Polish)
- Клюківський Ю. Кляштор Бернардинів у Заславі 1602 р. // Короткі звідомлення Всеукраїнського археологічного комітету за 1926 р. — Київ, 1927.
- Wyczawski H. E. Zasław // Klasztory bernardyńskie w Polsce w jej granicach historycznych. — Kalwaria Zebrzydowska, 1985. (in Polish)
- Памятники градостроительства и архитектуры Украинской ССР. — К., 1986. — Т. 4. — С. 204—205. (in Russian)
- Betlej A. Kościół oo. Bernardynów w Zasławiu. Źródła archiwalne do dziejów wystroju późnobarokowego. // Biuletyn Historii Sztuki. — 1995. — № 3—4. — S. 353—363. (in Polish)
- Мурженко А. ГУЛАГ после Солженицына // Континент. — 1989. — № 59. — С. 281—291. (in Russian)
- Мурженко А. Маски // Страна и мир. — 1991. — № 2. — С. 83—87. (in Russian)
- Polacy na Ukrainie. Zbiór dokumentów. Cz. 1: lata 1917—1939. T. II. — Przemyśl, 1999. — S. 171—173. — ISBN 83-909229-9-1. (in Polish)
- Єсюнін С. М. До історії Бернардинського монастиря в Ізяславі на межі XIX-ХХ ст. // Вісник Нетішинського краєзнавчого музею. Т. ІІ-ІІІ. — Нетішин, 2003—2004. — C. 268.
- Байталюк О. Діяльність Київської крайової інспектури охорони пам'яток культури та мистецтва з охорони монастиря бернардинів у м. Ізяслав // Краєзнавство. — 2012. — Ч. 3 (80). — C. 113—117.
- Dworzak A. Sanktuarium oo. Bernardynów w Zasławiu w XVIII stuleciu // Історія релігій в Україні. Науковий щорічник. — Львів : Логос, 2014. — S. 326—340. — ISBN 966-7379-70-1. (in Polish)
