= Aleksander Janusz Zasławski =

Polish noble (1650–1682)

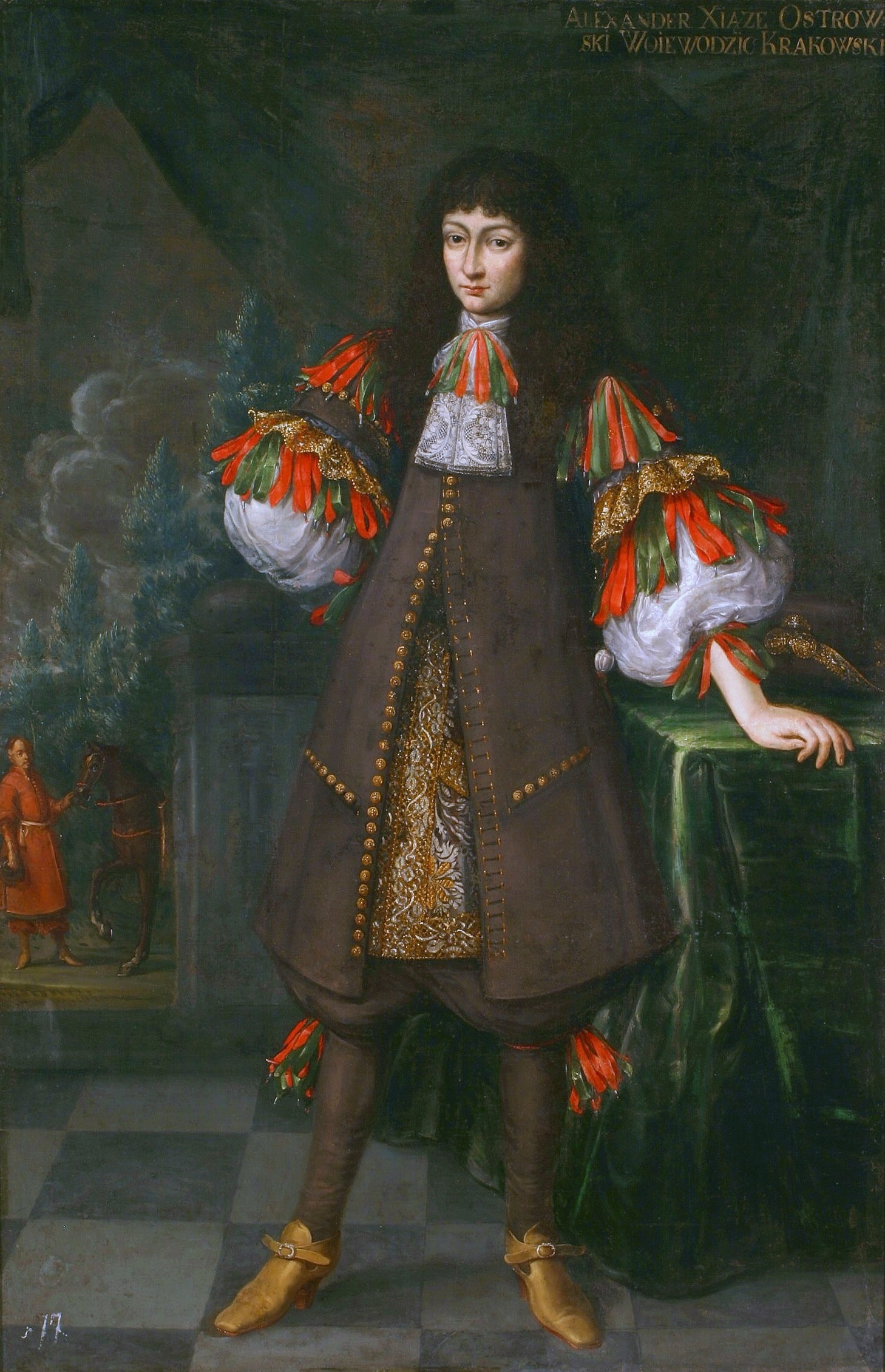

- Coat of arms: Ostrogski
- Born: 1650
- Died: 1682 (aged 31–32)
- Family: Zasławski-Ostrogski
- Father: Władysław Dominik Zasławski h. Ostrogski
- Mother: Katarzyna Sobieska h. Janina

Prince Aleksander Janusz Zasławski-Ostrogski (1650–1682) was the last male representative of the Ostrogski princely line. He was the 4th ordynat of the Ostrogski family fee tail.

== Biography ==
Son of Prince Władysław Dominik Zasławski (Note: According to some sources, Aleksander was the son of Katarzyna Sobieska and her lover, probably Prince Dymitr Wiśniowiecki (1631-1682)) and Katarzyna Sobieska, daughter of magnate Voivode of Bełz and Ruthenia Jakub Sobieski h. Janina, the sister of King of Poland Jan III Sobieski.

In 1669, he aspired to become Polish King by election but, in the event, the throne went to Michał Korybut Wiśniowiecki. In 1670, Prince Zasławski founded a Jurydyka in Warsaw on Magdeburg rights, which was named Alexandria in his honour. In this place was built Palace by Janusz Ostrogski.

Alexander died in 1682 leaving no successors, whole fortune of both Ostrogski and Zasławski families was inherited by Józef Karol Lubomirski because of his marriage to Teofila Ludwika Zasławska, sister of Aleksander Janusz Zasławski.

== Ancestry ==
Zofia Teofillia Daniłowicz | Jakub Sobieski | Eufrozyna Ostrogska | Aleksander Zasławski
Katarzyna Sobieska | Władysław Dominik Zasławski
Aleksander Janusz Zasławski
