= Iziaslav Vladimirovich =

Iziaslav Vladimirovich may refer to:

- Izyaslav of Polotsk (reigned 989–1001), the son of Vladimir I of Kiev and Rogneda of Polotsk
- Iziaslav IV Vladimirovich (born 1186)
- Izyaslav Vladimirovich of Putivl (fl. 1211-1223)

== See also ==
- Iziaslav (disambiguation)
