= Belarusian Autocephalous Orthodox Church =

Orthodox church in Belarus

- Беларуская аўтакефальная праваслаўная царква
- Emblem
- Classification: Eastern Orthodox
- Orientation: Slavic Orthodox
- Scripture: Septuagint, New Testament
- Theology: Eastern Orthodox theology
- Polity: Episcopal
- Metropolitan: Sviataslaw (Login)
- Priests: 8
- Parishes: 9
- Language: Belarusian
- Headquarters: Cathedral of St. Cyril of Turau, New York City
- Territory: Belarusian diaspora
- Origin: 1922
- Recognition: Unrecognized
- Separated from: Russian Orthodox Church
- Official website: belacp.org

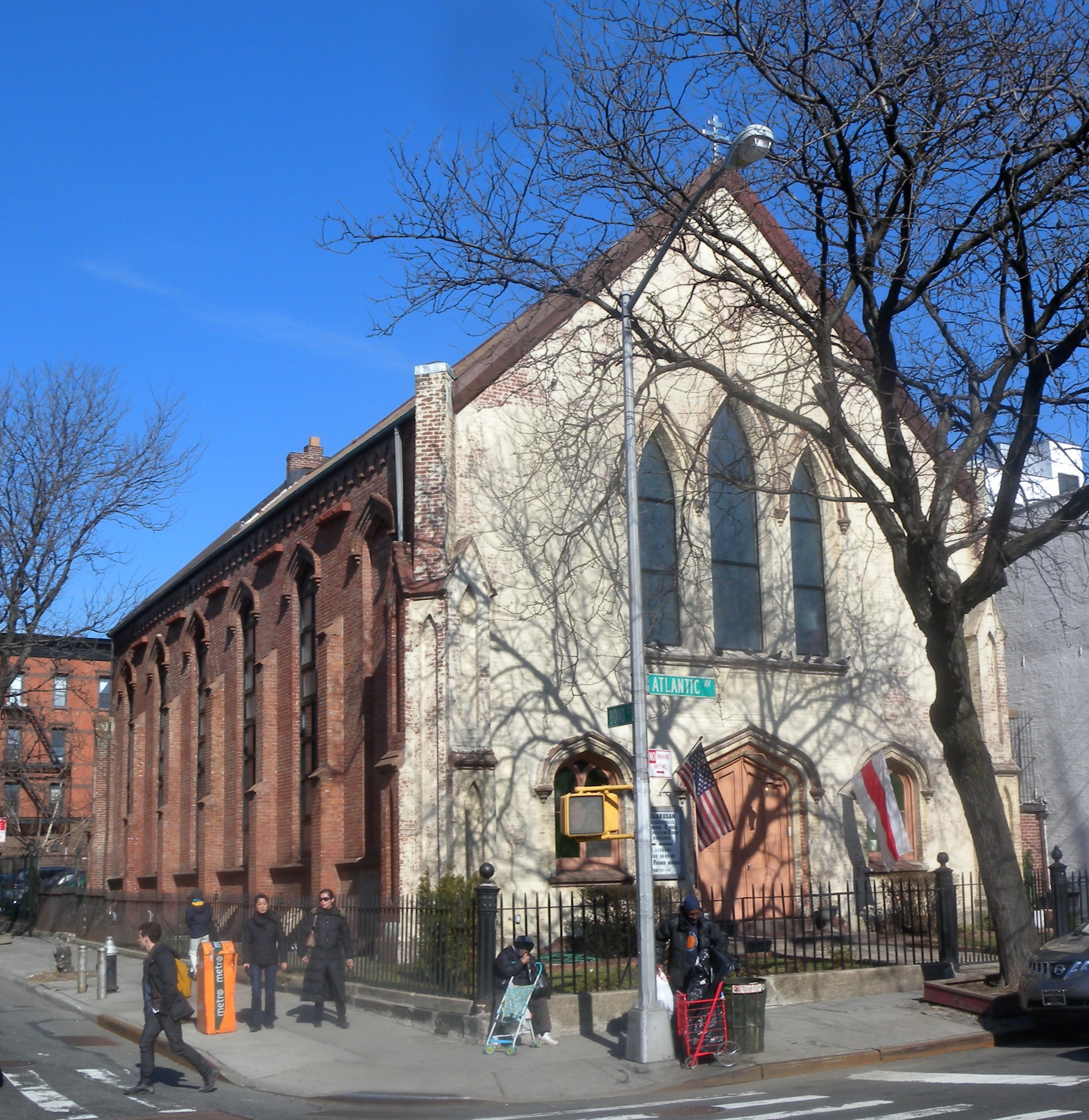
Cathedral of St. Cyril of Turau, New York City

The Belarusian Autocephalous Orthodox Church (Belarusian: Беларуская аўтакефальная праваслаўная царква, Bielaruskaja aŭtakiefaĺnaja pravaslaŭnaja carkva BAPC), sometimes abbreviated as B.A.O. Church or BAOC, is an independent Eastern Orthodox church, unrecognized by the mainstream Eastern Orthodox communion. Due to persecution against the Church in the Republic of Belarus, it exists either underground or abroad.

The church separated from the Russian Orthodox Church on 23 July 1922, in an attempt to revive a national church in the territory of the Byelorussian Soviet Socialist Republic which before the partitions of Poland existed as eparchies (diocese) of Orthodox Church in the Polish-Lithuanian Commonwealth and under Ecumenical Patriarchate of Constantinople.

Following the German occupation of Byelorussia, the church was re-established on 30 August 1942; the effort was supported by the Belarusian Central Council and the Polish Orthodox Church. With the advance of the Red Army in 1944, BAPC leaders largely immigrated to Germany.

On 5 June 1948, bishops and members of the BAPC which had managed to escape from the Soviet Union met in Konstanz (on the Lake Constance) and reorganized their activities abroad with the help of its sister church the Ukrainian Autocephalous Orthodox Church and its primate Polikarp (Sikorsky).

The church is currently based in Brooklyn, New York City and is mainly active within the Belarusian diaspora. It currently has nine (previously eleven) parishes: it has two (previously four) churches in the United States, three in Australia, one in Canada, one in the United Kingdom and, since 2010, one in Belarus; it also has a mission in the United States. It has been led by Metropolitan Sviataslaw (Login) since 2008.

Its activities in Belarus are strongly opposed by the Belarusian Exarchate of the Russian Orthodox Church and the Belarusian government.

== Primates ==
- 1922–1931 Melchizedek (Pajewski)
- 1931–1937 Philaret (Ramenski)
- 1942–1946 Panteleimon (Rozhnovsky) (as part of the Moscow Patriarchate)
  - Philotheus (Narko), temporary
- 1946–1948 Alexander (Inozemtsev), temporary
- 1948–1971 Sergius (Okhotenko)
- 1972–1983 Andrew (Kryt)
- 1984–2007 Iziaslav (Brutskiy)
- 2008–present Sviataslaw (Login)

== Parishes ==
=== In the United States ===
- St. Cyril of Turau Cathedral, Brooklyn, New York City, New York (headquarters)
- St. Cyril of Turov Church, Jamaica, New York City, New York (formerly a parish of the Belarusian Autocephalous Orthodox Church; currently a parish of the American Carpatho-Russian Orthodox Church).
- St. Mary of Zyrovicy Church, Highland Park, New Jersey
- Zyrovicy Mother of God Cathedral, Cleveland, Ohio (formerly a parish of the Belarusian Autocephalous Orthodox Church; currently a parish of the Ukrainian Orthodox Church of the USA as of March 2024).

== See also ==
- Belarusian Greek Catholic Church
- Belarusian Exarchate of the Russian Orthodox Church
