= Katarzyna Sobieska =

Polish noblewoman (1634–1694)

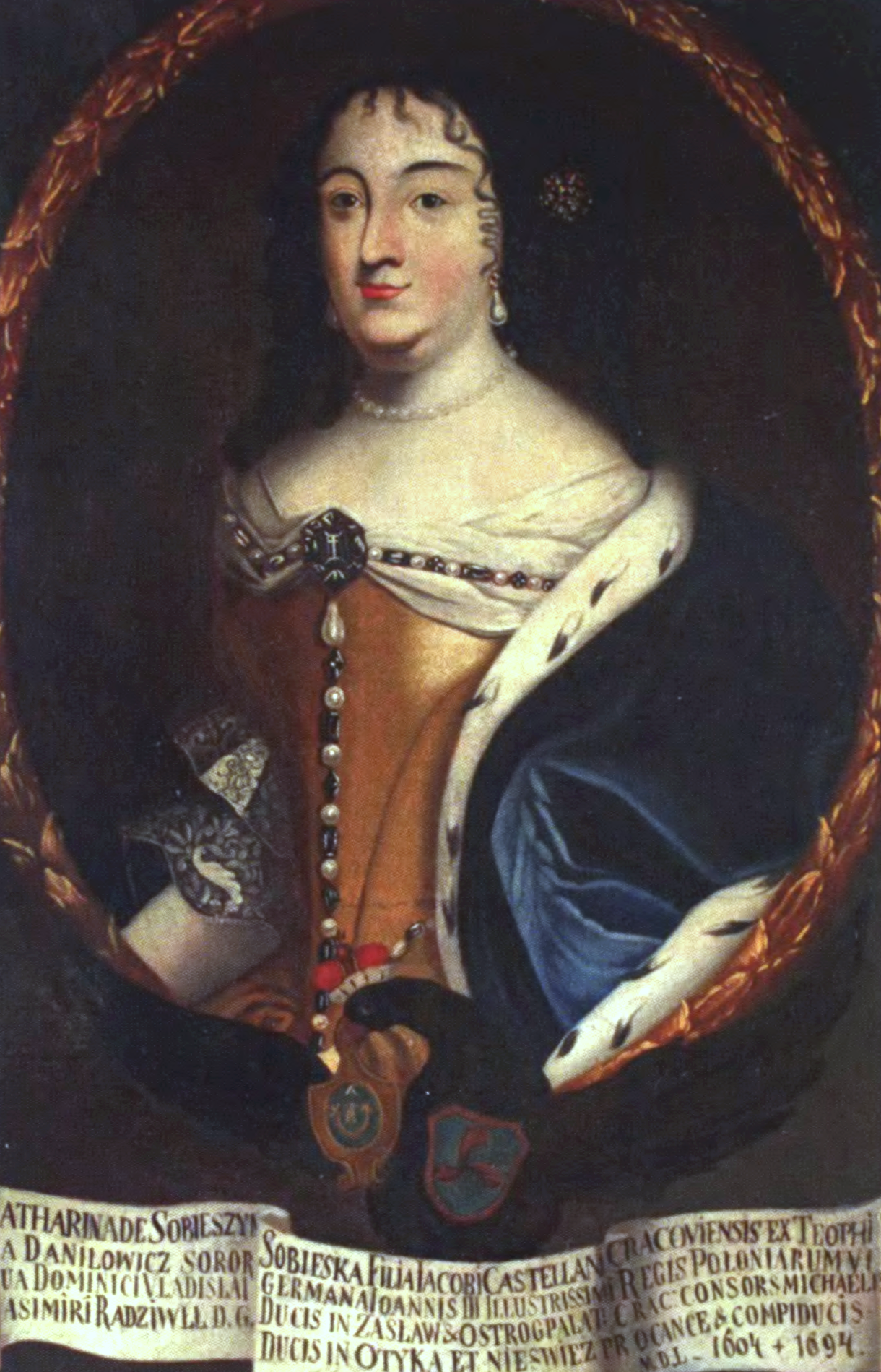
- Coat of arms: Janina
- Born: 7 January 1634; Złoczów
- Died: 29 September 1694 (aged 60); Warsaw
- Family: Sobieski
- Consort: Władysław Dominik Zasławski; Michał Kazimierz Radziwiłł
- Issue: with Władyslaw Dominisk Zasławski; Aleksander Janusz Zasławski-Ostrogski; Teofilia Ludwika Zasławska with Michał Kazimierz Radziwiłł; Jerzy Józef Radziwiłł; Karol Stanisław Radziwiłł
- Father: Jakub Sobieski
- Mother: Zofia Teofillia Daniłowicz

Katarzyna Sobieska (1634–1694) was the sister of King John III Sobieski of Poland and a noblewoman. She married Władysław Dominik Zasławski in 1650. She was later married to Michał Kazimierz Radziwiłł on 13 June 1658.
