= Thomas Zaslavsky =

American mathematician

Thomas Zaslavsky (born 1944) is an American mathematician specializing in combinatorics.

== Early life ==
Zaslavsky's mother Claudia Zaslavsky was a high school mathematics teacher and ethnomathematician from New York, and his father Sam Zaslavsky was an electrical engineer from Manhattan. Zaslavsky received his undergraduate degree from the City College of New York. He then studied arrangement of hyperplanes with Curtis Greene at the Massachusetts Institute of Technology and received a Ph.D. in 1974. In 1975, the American Mathematical Society published his doctoral thesis.

== Career ==
Zaslavsky has been a professor of mathematics at Binghamton University since 1985. He has published papers on matroid theory, hyperplane arrangements, coding theory, lattice point counting, and Sperner theory. He has also made available a bibliography on signed graphs and their applications.

== Select publications ==
- Zaslavsky, Thomas (2015). "Bibliography, glossary, and problem list for signed, gained, and biased graphs". Binghamton University.
- Zaslavsky, Thomas (2003). "Faces of a hyperplane arrangement enumerated by ideal dimension, with application to plane, plaids, and Shi". Geometriae Dedicata. 98: 63–80. doi:10.1023/A:1024029318990.
- Seymour, P. D.; Zaslavsky, Thomas (June 1984). "Averaging sets: a generalization of mean values and spherical designs". Advances in Mathematics. 52 (3): 213–240. doi:10.1016/0001-8708(84)90022-7.
- Greene, Curtis; Zaslavsky, Thomas (1983). "On the interpretation of Whitney numbers through arrangements of hyperplanes, zonotopes, non-Radon partitions, and orientations of graphs". Transactions of the American Mathematical Society. 280 (1): 97–126. doi:10.2307/1999604. JSTOR 1999604. MR 0712251.
- Zaslavsky, Thomas (1975). Facing up to Arrangements: Face-count Formulas for Partitions of Space by Hyperplanes. Memoirs of the American Mathematical Society. Vol. 1. doi:10.1090/memo/0154.
