= Claudia Zaslavsky =

American ethnomathematician

- Born: Claudia Natoma Cohen; January 12, 1917; Manhattan, New York City
- Died: January 13, 2006 (aged 89); Harlem, New York
- Education: Hunter College; University of Michigan
- Occupations: mathematics teacher and ethnomathematician
- Spouse: Sam Zaslavsky
- Children: Thomas Zaslavsky; Alan Zaslavsky

Claudia Zaslavsky (January 12, 1917 – January 13, 2006) was an American mathematics teacher and ethnomathematician.

== Life ==
She was born Claudia Natoma Cohen (later changed to Cogan) on January 12, 1917, in Upper Manhattan in New York City and grew up in Allentown, Pennsylvania. She attributed her first interest in mathematics to her early childhood experiences when she helped her parents in their dry goods store.

She studied mathematics at Hunter College and then earned a master's degree in statistics at the University of Michigan.

In the 1950s while raising her children she was the bookkeeper at Chelsea Publishing Co. and taught pre-instrument classes to small children.

=== Math teacher ===
She became a mathematics teacher at Woodlands High School in Hartsdale, New York.

She pursued postgraduate study in mathematics education at Teachers College, Columbia University, in 1974–1978. During that time she sought to learn about mathematics in Africa to better capture the interest of the African-American students in her classes.

She discovered "that little of what was known about this topic [African cultural mathematics] was available in accessible sources."

Thus began a years-long project of assembling, organizing and interpreting a vast amount of little-known material on expressions of mathematics in diverse African cultures, including number words and signs, reckoning of time, games, and architectural and decorative patterns. Her field work on a trip to East Africa in 1970 was assisted by the photography of her husband Sam and travel guidance from her son Alan, then teaching in Kenya.

Zaslavsky wrote the book Africa Counts about mathematics in African culture to sum up her discoveries up to that time.

Her work was welcomed into the burgeoning field of ethnomathematics, which studies the ways in which mathematical concepts are expressed and used by people in diverse cultures in the course of everyday life. As she wrote, "scholars of ethnomathematics examine the practice of mathematics from an anthropological point of view."

Zaslavsky was a lifelong activist for civil rights, peace and social justice. She also mentored many new scholars and activists in the field of ethnomathematics, specifically interested in discovering and recognizing the mathematical accomplishments of groups currently underrepresented, including women. As a Jew, Zaslavsky had experienced her own struggles with discrimination against women and Jewish people during her formative years in the 1930s and 1940s.

=== Personal life ===
One of her children, Alan Zaslavsky, became a teacher in Kenya, a progressive activist, and later a statistician. The other, Thomas Zaslavsky, became a mathematician.

Zaslavsky died of pancreatic cancer in Harlem, New York, on January 13, 2006, survived by her husband Sam and their two sons.

== Books ==
Zaslavsky's books include:

- Africa Counts: Number and Pattern in African Cultures (Prindle, Weber, and Schmidt, 1973; 3rd ed., Chicago Review Press, 1999)
- Preparing Young Children for Math: A Book of Games (Schocken, 1979)
- Count On Your Fingers African Style (Thomas Y. Crowell, 1980)
- Math Comes Alive: Activities from Many Cultures (J. Weston Walch, 1987)
- Tic-Tac-Toe (Thomas Y. Crowell, 1982}
- Zero: Is it Something? is it Nothing? (Watts, 1989)
- Multicultural Mathematics: Interdisciplinary Cooperative-learning Activities, Gr. 6-9 (1993)
- Multicultural Math: Hands-On Math Activities from Around the World (Scholastic, 1994)
- Fear of Math: How to Get Over It and Get On With Your Life (Rutgers University Press, 1994)
- The Multicultural Math Classroom: Bringing in the World (Heinemann, 1996)
- Math Games and Activities from Around the World (Chicago Review Press, 1998)
- Number Sense and Nonsense: Building Math Creativity and Confidence Through Number Play (Chicago Review Press, 2001)
- More Math Games and Activities from Around the World (Chicago Review Press, 2003)
