= Zasławski =

Polish princely family

- Ostrogski coat of arms
- Current region: Poland
- Origin: Iziaslav
- Members: Aleksander Zasławski; Władysław Zasławski
- Connected families: Ostrogski family
- Estate: Starozasławski Castle

Possessions of Ostrogski are marked in pink; Zasławski (partially) in red

The House of Zasławski (plural Zasławscy) was the name of a Polish–Ruthenian noble family and a cadet branch of the Ostrogski family. The Zasławski family had its power base in Volhynia, Crown of the Kingdom of Poland (today in Ukraine), and traced its origins to a branch of the Rurikids that took its name from Iziaslav. Due to their relation to the Rurikids, the Zasławski family held the title of knyaz (prince).

== History ==
The Zasławski family was one of the three major families in the Polish–Lithuanian Commonwealth to trace its origins to either Kaributas (they used Korybut coat of arms) or, according to modern historical interpretations, the Ruthenian Rurikids; the other two families were the Ostrogski family and the Wiśniowiecki family. The Zasławski family was sometimes seen as a junior line of the Ostrogoski family.

After the death in 1620 of the last male heir of the Ostrogoski family, Janusz Ostrogski, many of the Ostrogoski possessions were inherited by the Zasławcy. However, the Zasławski family faced a similar fate when their last male heir, Aleksander Janusz Zasławski, died in 1682. Their huge possessions passed to the Lubomirski family (due to their marriage with Aleksander's sister, Teofilia Ludwika Zasławska) and other families of Polish szlachta. A complicated litigation concerning the Ostrogski inheritance continued until the Russian Empire annexed Poland during the Partitions.

== Notable members ==
- Vasyl′ "Krasny" Ostrogski, father of Yurii
- Yuri Zasławski (1432–1500), Prince of Iziaslav (Zaslav), progenitor of Zaslavski clan who inherited the Zasław town
- Ivan Zasławski (died 1515), Prince of Zaslav and Ostrog
- Kuz′ma Zasławski (died 1556)
- Janusz Zasławski (1548–1629), voivode of Podlaskie and Volhynia
- Konstanty Alexander Zasławski, (1620–1642)
- Aleksander Zasławski (died 1628), voivode of Bratslav, and Kiev
- Władysław Dominik Zasławski-Ostrogski (1618–1656), voivode of Kraków
- Aleksander Janusz Zasławski (c. 1650–1682), last male heir
- Teofila Ludwika Zasławska (1650–1709), last female heir
