= Aleksandr Zaslavsky =

Russian footballer

Personal information
- Full name: Aleksandr Vladimirovich Zaslavsky
- Date of birth: 13 July 1996 (age 30)
- Place of birth: Omsk, Russia
- Height: 1.78 m (5 ft 10 in)
- Positions: Midfielder; forward

Senior career*
Years	Team	Apps	(Gls)
2015–2016	FC Tyumen	1	(0)
2016–2017	FC Irtysh Omsk	1	(0)
- * Club domestic league appearances and goals

Aleksandr Vladimirovich Zaslavsky (Russian: Александр Владимирович Заславский; born 13 July 1996) is a Russian former football player.

== Club career ==
He made his debut in the Russian Football National League for FC Tyumen on 28 September 2015 in a game against FC Gazovik Orenburg.
