= Iziaslav Brutskiy =

Primate of the Belarusian Autocephalous Orthodox Church

Iziasłaŭ
- Ізяслаў
- Born: Ivan Daniłavič Brucki; January 22, 1926; Biełavuša, Polesie Voivodeship, Poland (now Belarus)
- Died: November 26, 2007 (aged 81); New Jersey, U.S.
- Occupation: Primate of the Belarusian Autocephalous Orthodox Church

Metropolitan Iziasłaŭ (Note: Belarusian: Ізяслаў, romanized: Izyaslaw) (22 January 1926 – 26 November 2007, born Ivan Daniłavič Brucki) (Note: Belarusian: Іван Данілавіч Бруцкі, romanized: Ivan Danilavich Brutski) was the primate of the Belarusian Autocephalous Orthodox Church.

Ivan Brucki was born in a wealthy farmer's family in Biełavuša (now Stolin Raion in Brest Voblast), West Belarus. After the annexation of West Belarus by the Soviet Union in 1939, Brucki's father was in 1940 exiled to Kazakhstan.

In 1943 the young Ivan Brucki was sent by the Nazis to Germany as an ostarbeiter. Having avoided repatriation in 1947, Ivan Brucki graduated from a gymnasium in Hannover. He then immigrated to Canada and participated there in the local Belarusian social and life and the parish life of the Belarusian Autocephalous Orthodox Church.

In 1962, he immigrated to the U.S. and became an active member in different political and religious organizations in Cleveland and Detroit.

As a member of the Belarusian Autocephalous Orthodox Church and an active member of the community, he was delegated to the Church Council (Sabor) of this jurisdiction which took place in May 1972 in Highland Park, New Jersey.

In 1979, he was ordained to the diaconate and later that same year to the priesthood. He graduated from the St. Sophia Ukrainian Orthodox Theological Seminary in 1981. Then, by the hierarchs of the Belarusian Autocephalous Orthodox Church and Ukrainian Autocephalous Orthodox Church he was consecrated to the rank of bishop. Shortly after that, he become archbishop and in 1984, Archbishop Iziasłaŭ was elevated to the rank of metropolitan and elected to be the Primate of the Belarusian Autocephalous Orthodox Church.
