= Władysław Dominik Zasławski =

Polish nobleman (c. 1616 – 1656)

- Prince
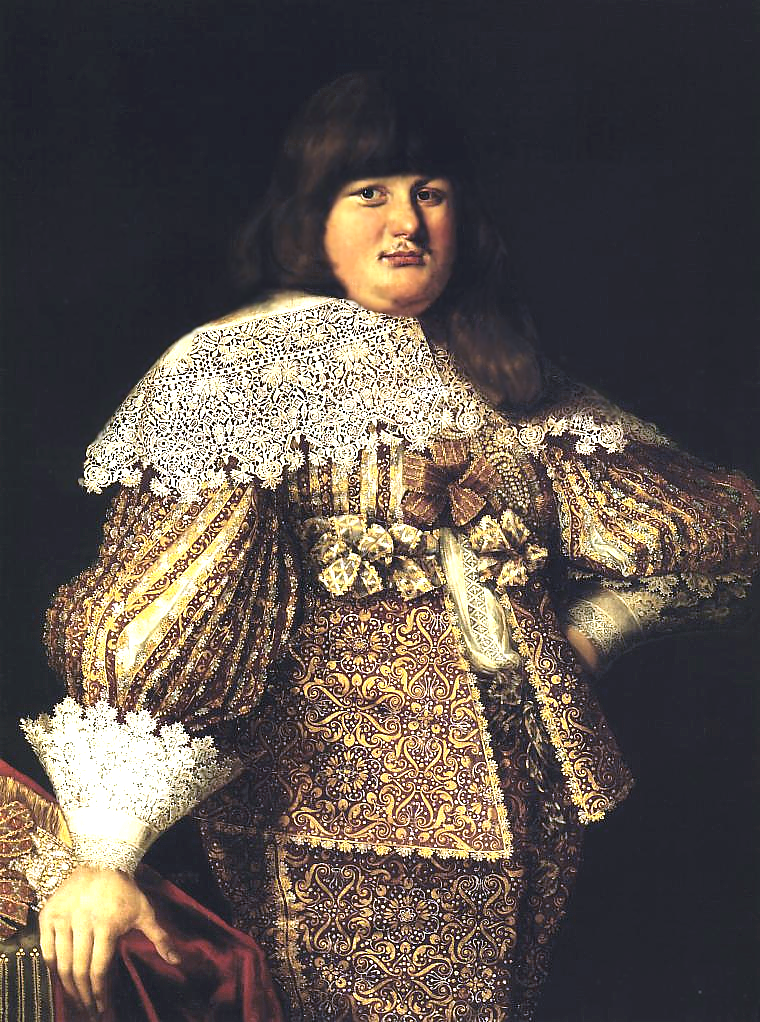
- Portrait by Bartlomiej Strobel, 1635
- Coat of arms: Herb własny
- Full name: Władysław Dominik ks. Zasławski h. Ostrogski
- Born: c. 1616; Przemyśl
- Died: 5 May 1656; Stare Selo, near Lwów
- Noble family: Zasławski
- Consort: Zofia Prudencja Ligęza h. Półkozic; Katarzyna Sobieska h. Janina
- Father: Aleksander Zasławski
- Mother: Eufrozyna Ostrogska

Prince Władysław Dominik Zasławski-Ostrogski (c. 1616 – 1656) was a Polish nobleman (szlachcic) of Ruthenian stock. Prince of the Princely Houses of Poland, Ostroh Ordynat, Grand Koniuszy of The Crown.

Zasławski was the most powerful magnate in Volhynia at that time. He was voivode of Sandomierz Voivodeship from 1645 and voivode of Kraków Voivodeship from 1649. Starosta of Lutsk 1639–1653, regimentarz of the Crown 1648, second richest, after Stanisław Lubomirski, Polish magnate.

Thanks to chancellor Jerzy Ossoliński elected on Convocation Sejm as one of three regimentarz of the pospolite ruszenie during the Battle of Pyliavtsi in 1648. Because of his incompetence as a main regimentarz the battle were lost. In 1651 he participated in the Battle of Beresteczko. During the Swedish invasion ("The Deluge") was loyal to the king John Casimir Vasa, he prepared the defence of Przemyśl.

Since the third decade of 17th century his barony was Stare Selo near Lviv. There he started to build fortress in 1642, which was destroyed during the siege of Lviv in 1648 by the Cossack uprisers of Bohdan Khmelnytsky. Castle was rebuilt in years 1649–1654, inside the fortress was built a palace.

== Marriage and issue ==
Władysław Dominik married Zofia Prudencja Ligęza h. Półkozic in 1634 and Katarzyna Sobieska h. Janina, daughter of Jakub Sobieski voivode of the Ruthenian Voivodeship and sister of King Jan III Sobieski, in 1650 and had two children:

- Aleksander Janusz Zasławski (1650-1682), unmarried
- Teofila Ludwika Zasławska (1654-1709), married Prince Dymitr Jerzy Wiśniowiecki and later Józef Karol Lubomirski

== Ancestry ==
Władysław Dominik Zasławski
- Coat of arms
- Noble family: Ostrogski

Zuzanna Serediz	Janusz Ostrogski	Aleksandra Sanguszko	Janusz Zasławski
Eufrozyna Ostrogska	Aleksander Zasławski
Władysław Dominik Zasławski – Ostrogski

== Bibliography ==
- Jan Widacki, Kniaź Jarema, Katowice 1984, ISBN 83-216-0588-5
- Witold Biernacki, Żółte Wody – Korsuń, Warszawa 2004, ISBN 83-11-09824-7
