= Iziaslav, Ukraine =

City in Khmelnytskyi Oblast, Ukraine

Iziaslav Ізяслав Zaslav
- City
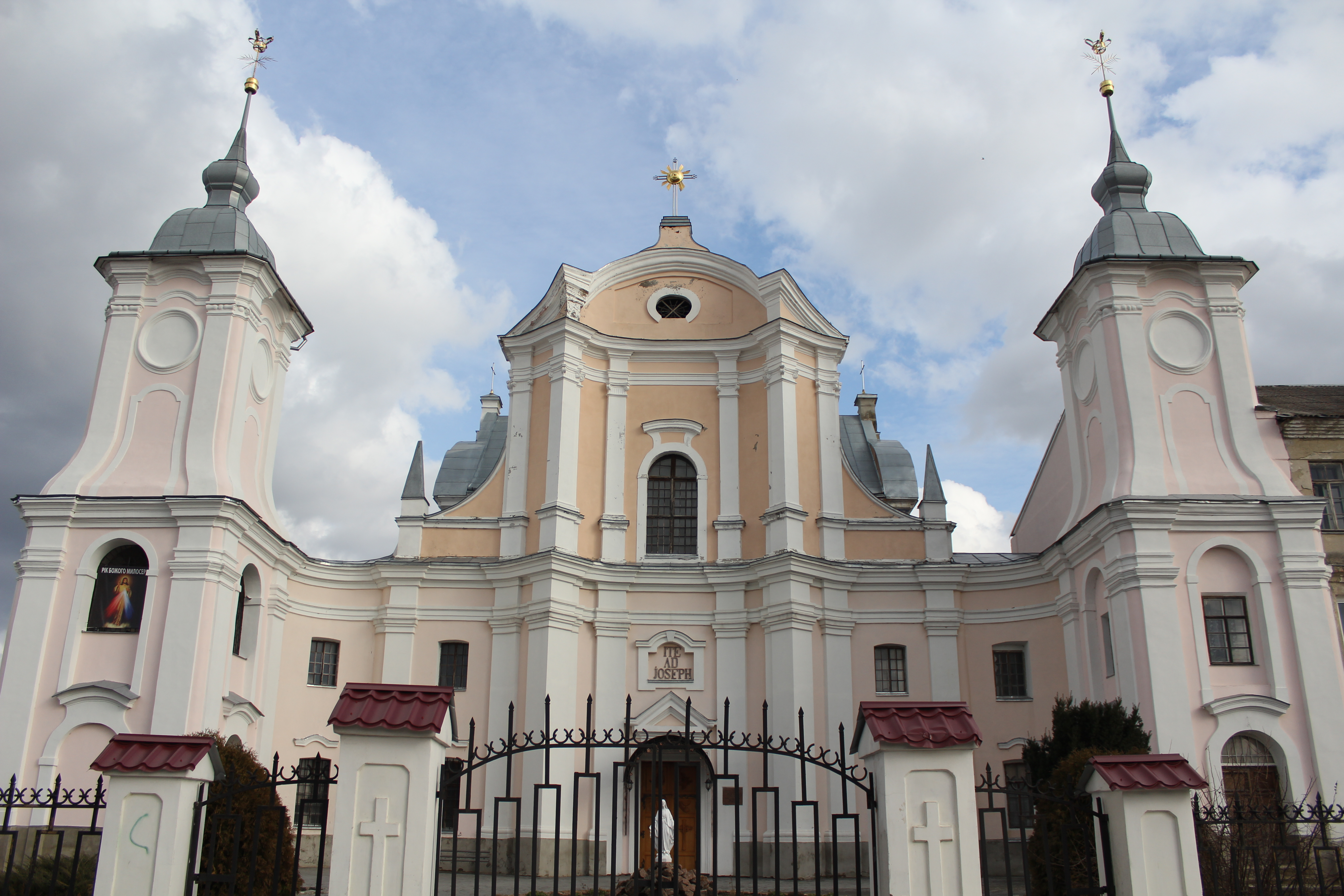
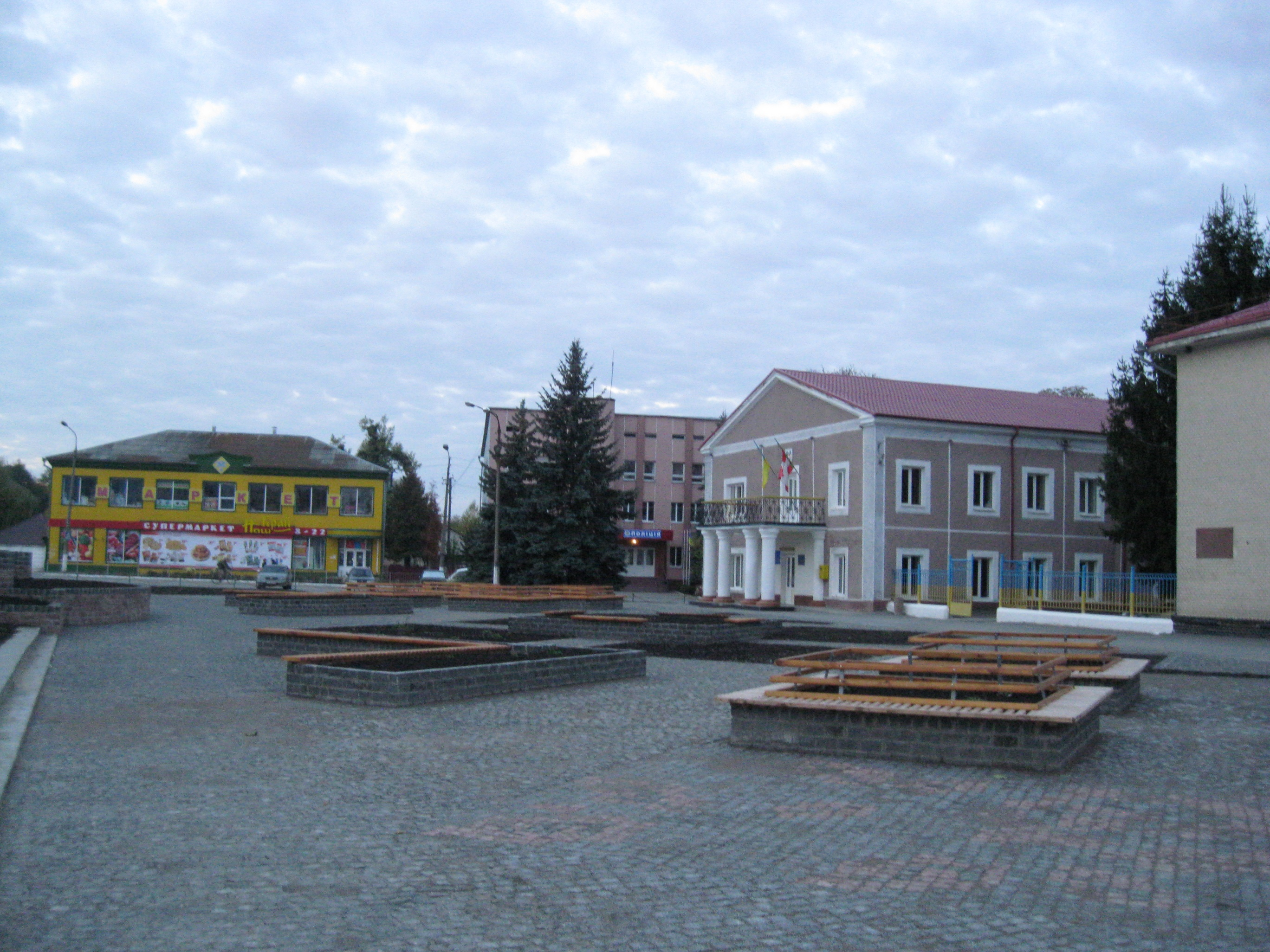
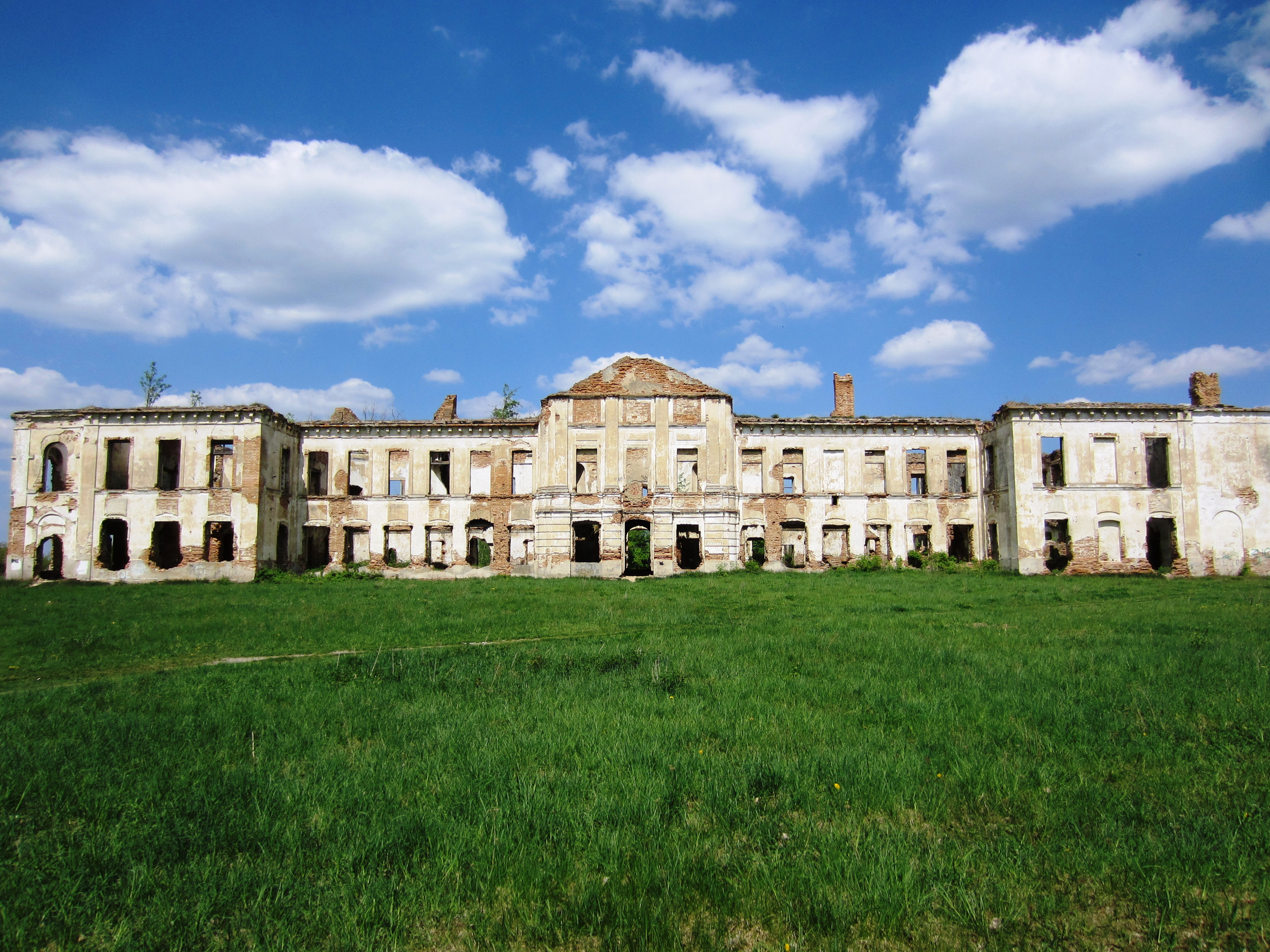
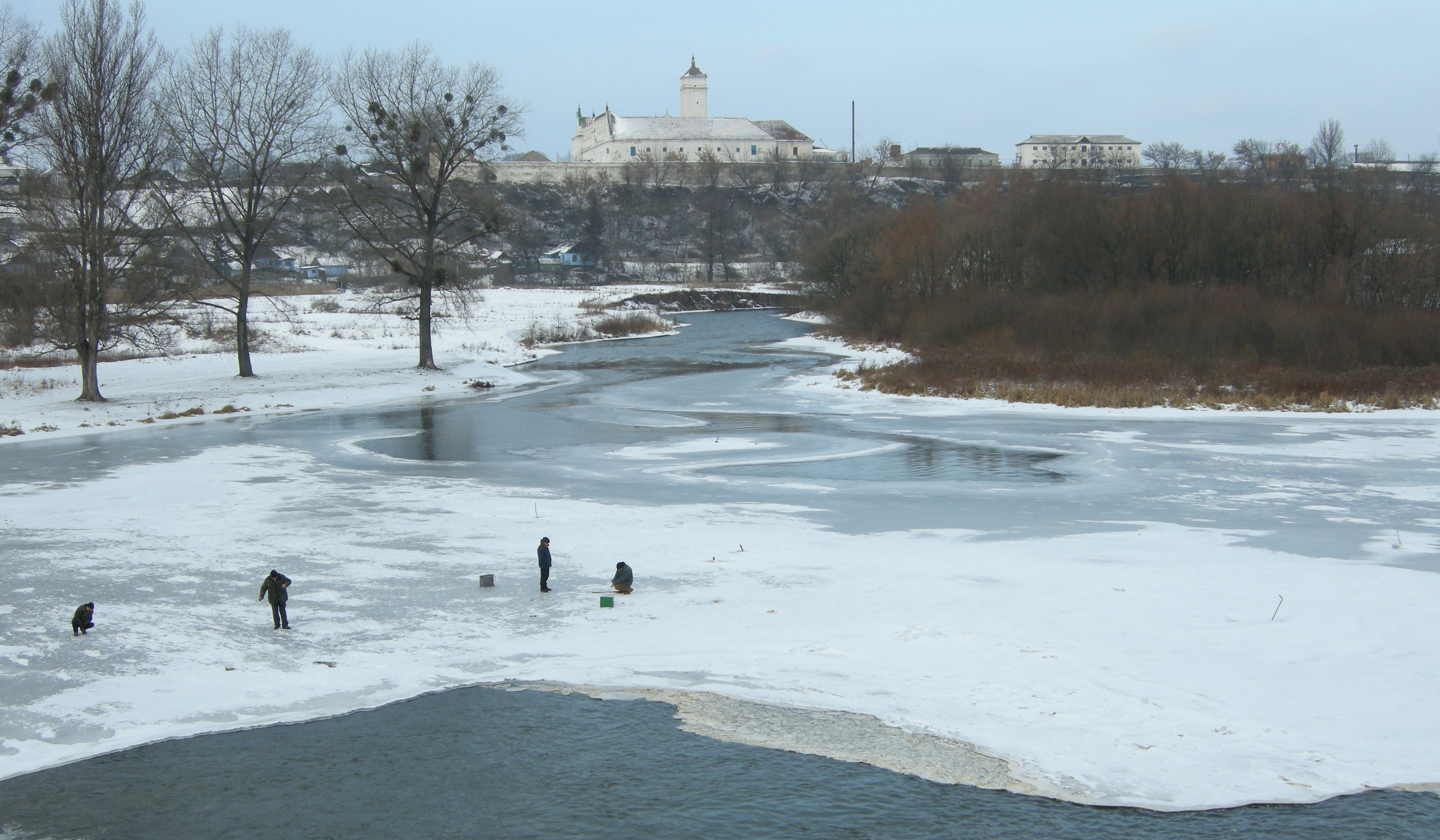
- Clockwise from top: Central square; Sanguszko Palace; Horyn River in winter and Bernardine Monastery; Church of St. Joseph and Lazarists Monastery

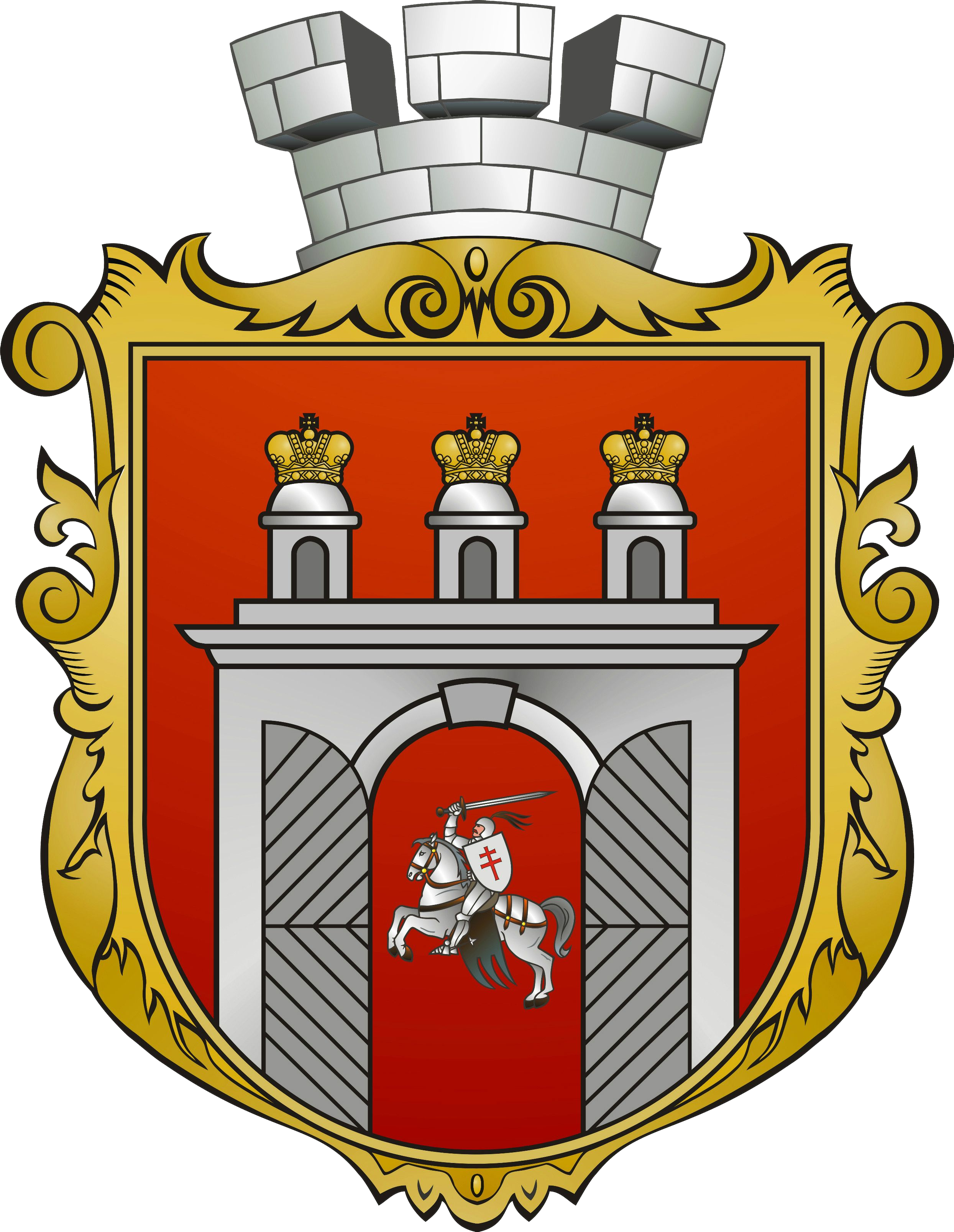
- Coat of arms

- Location within Khmelnytskyi Oblast Location within Ukraine
- Coordinates: 50°07′00″N 26°48′00″E
- Country: Ukraine
- Oblast: Khmelnytskyi Oblast
- Raion: Shepetivka Raion
- Hromada: Iziaslav urban hromada
- First mention date: 1390
- City rights: 1583

Government
  - Mayor: Valentyna Korniichuk

Area
  - Total: 23.91 km^{2} (9.23 sq mi)

Population (2022)
  - Total: 15,296
  - Density: 639.7/km^{2} (1,657/sq mi)
- Demonym: Zaslavian
- Time zone: UTC+2 (EET)
  - Summer (DST): UTC+3 (EEST)
- Postal code: 30300
- Area code: +3803852
- Website: http://izyaslav.miskrada.org.ua/

Iziaslav or Izyaslav (Ukrainian: Ізяслав, IPA: [iˈzʲɑslɐu̯]), also known as Zaslav (Ukrainian: Заслав, IPA: [ˈzɑslɐu̯]; Polish: Zasław, IPA: [ˈzaswaf]), is one of the oldest cities in Volhynia. Situated on the Horyn River in western Ukraine, the city dates back to the 11th century. Iziaslav belongs to Shepetivka Raion of Khmelnytskyi Oblast. It hosts the administration of Iziaslav urban hromada, one of the hromadas of Ukraine. Population: 15,296 (2022 estimate).

== History ==
Zaslav was first mentioned in 1390. It was a private town in Poland and part of the Volhynian Voivodeship. Starting from the 14th century was owned by the Ostrogski family, later being transferred to the Zasławski, and in 1673 to the Sanguszko family. In 1583 the city was granted Magdeburg city rights.

After the Partitions of Poland Iziaslav was part of the Russian Empire's Volhynian Governorate, and between 1796 and 1920 served as a district centre.

At the beginning of World War II, the town had a Jewish population representing 28% of the inhabitants. As soon as the Germans occupied the town, Jews were kept imprisoned in a ghetto and were later murdered in mass executions perpetrated by Einsatzgruppen.

Until 18 July 2020, Iziaslav was the administrative center of Iziaslav Raion. The raion was abolished in July 2020 as part of the administrative reform of Ukraine, which reduced the number of raions of Khmelnytskyi Oblast to three. The area of Iziaslav Raion was merged into Shepetivka Raion.

== Monuments ==
- Old Zaslav Castle
- New Zaslav Castle
- St. John's Cathedral
- Great Synagogue
- Church of St. Michael and Bernardine monastery
- Church of St. Joseph and Lazarists monastery
- Lazarists Hospital
- Sanguszko Palace
- Cloth Hall
- New Zaslav Synagogue

== Gallery ==
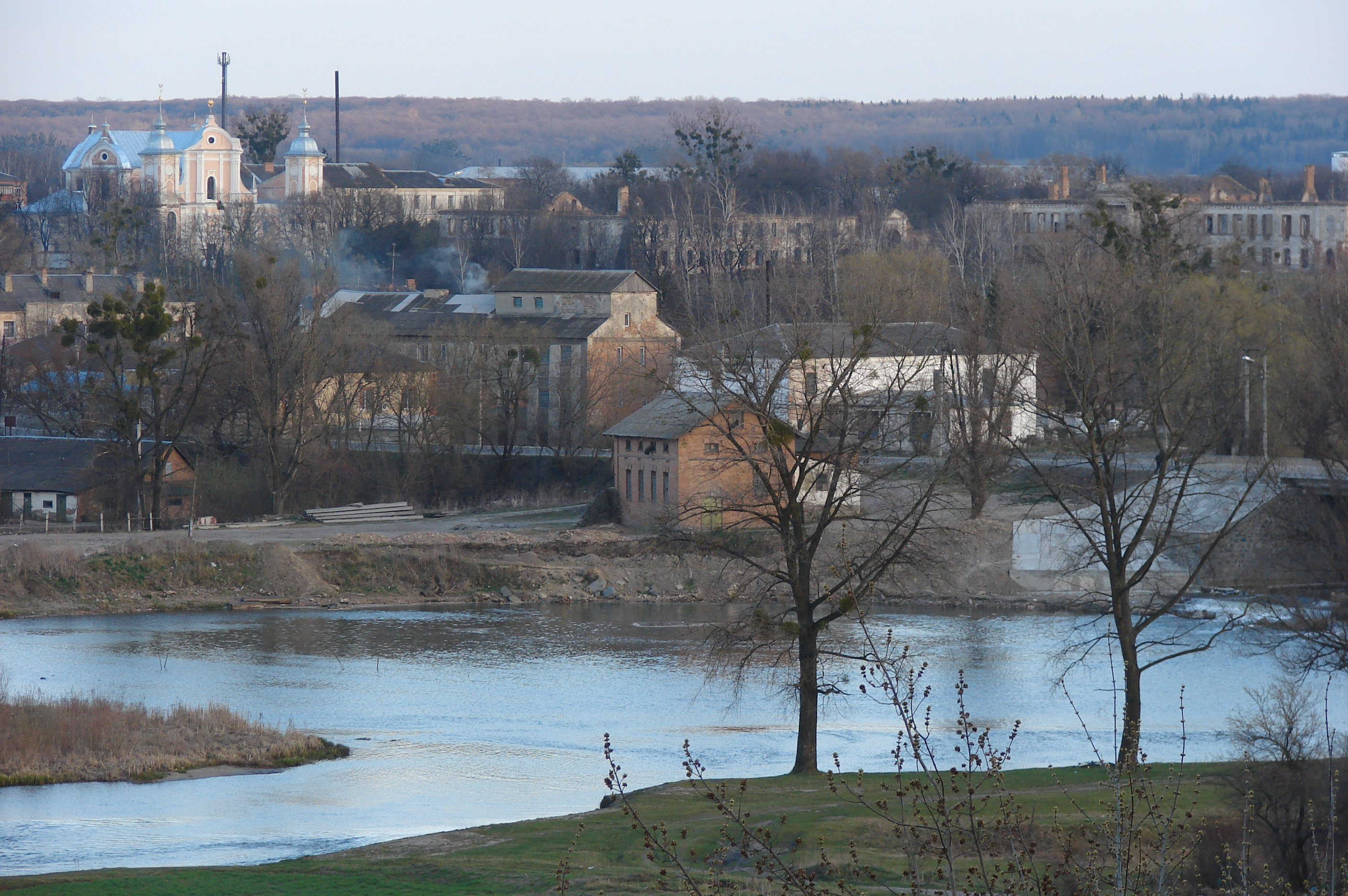
City view

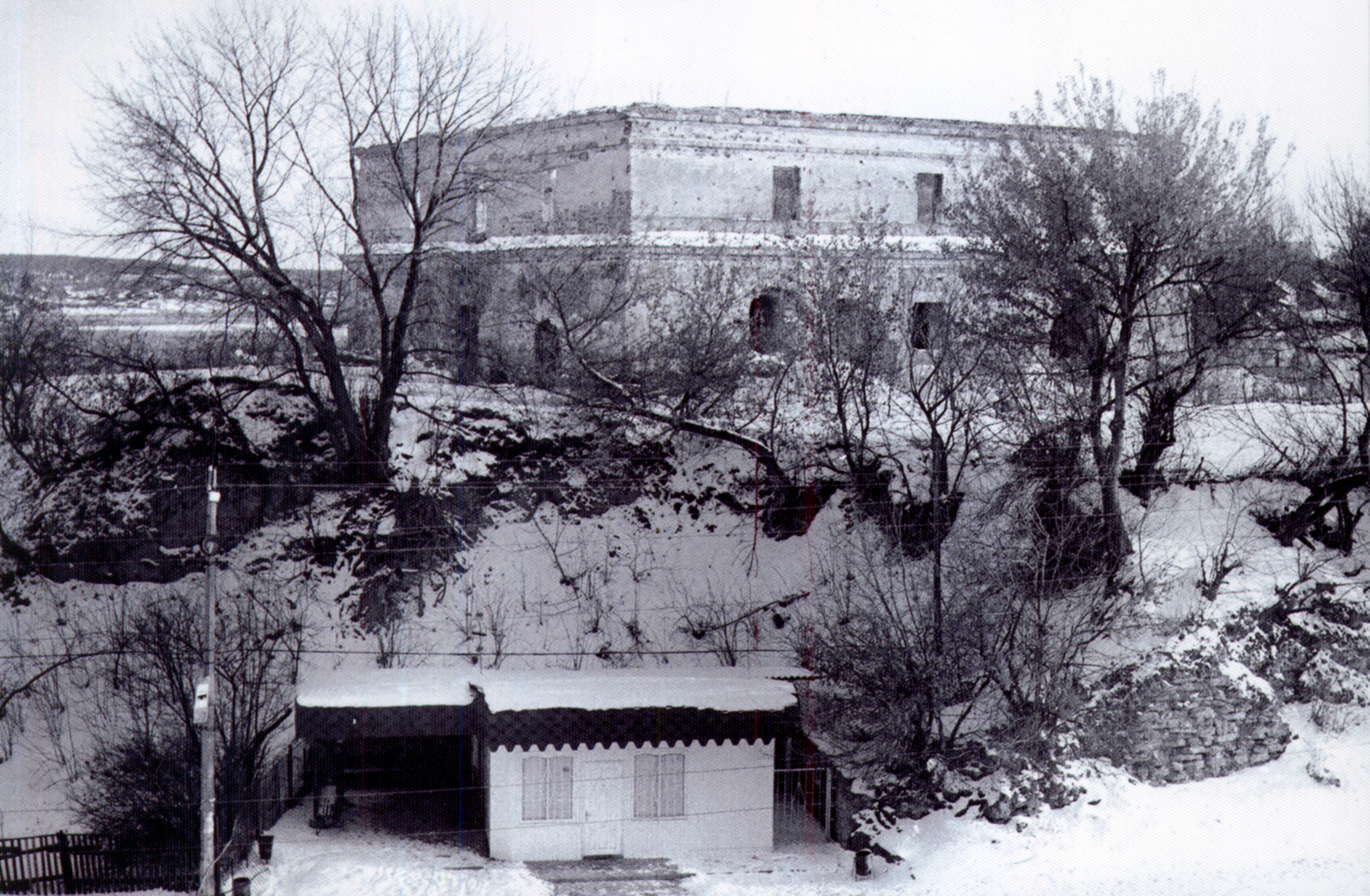
Old Zaslav Castle

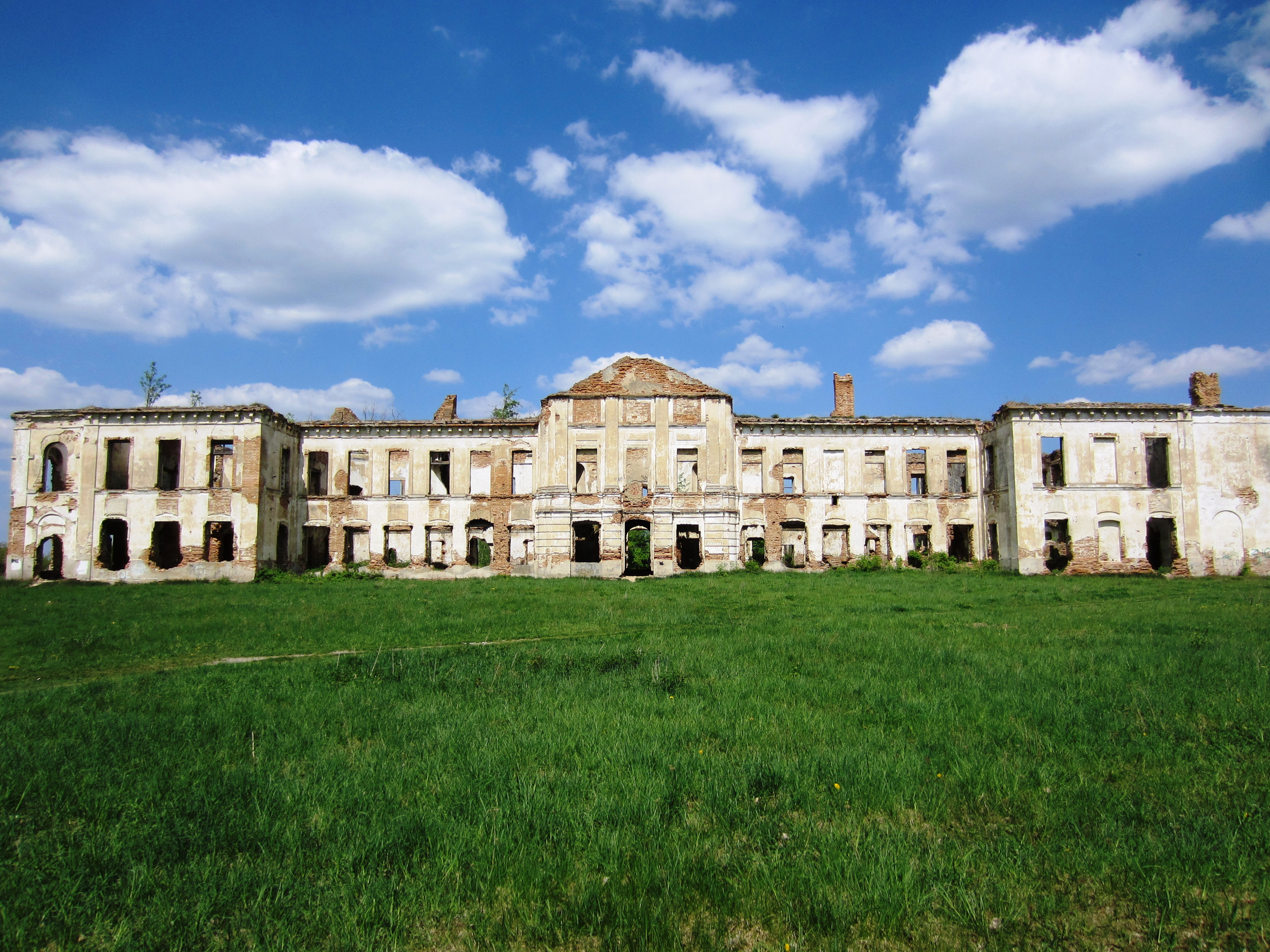
Ruins of Sanguszko Palace

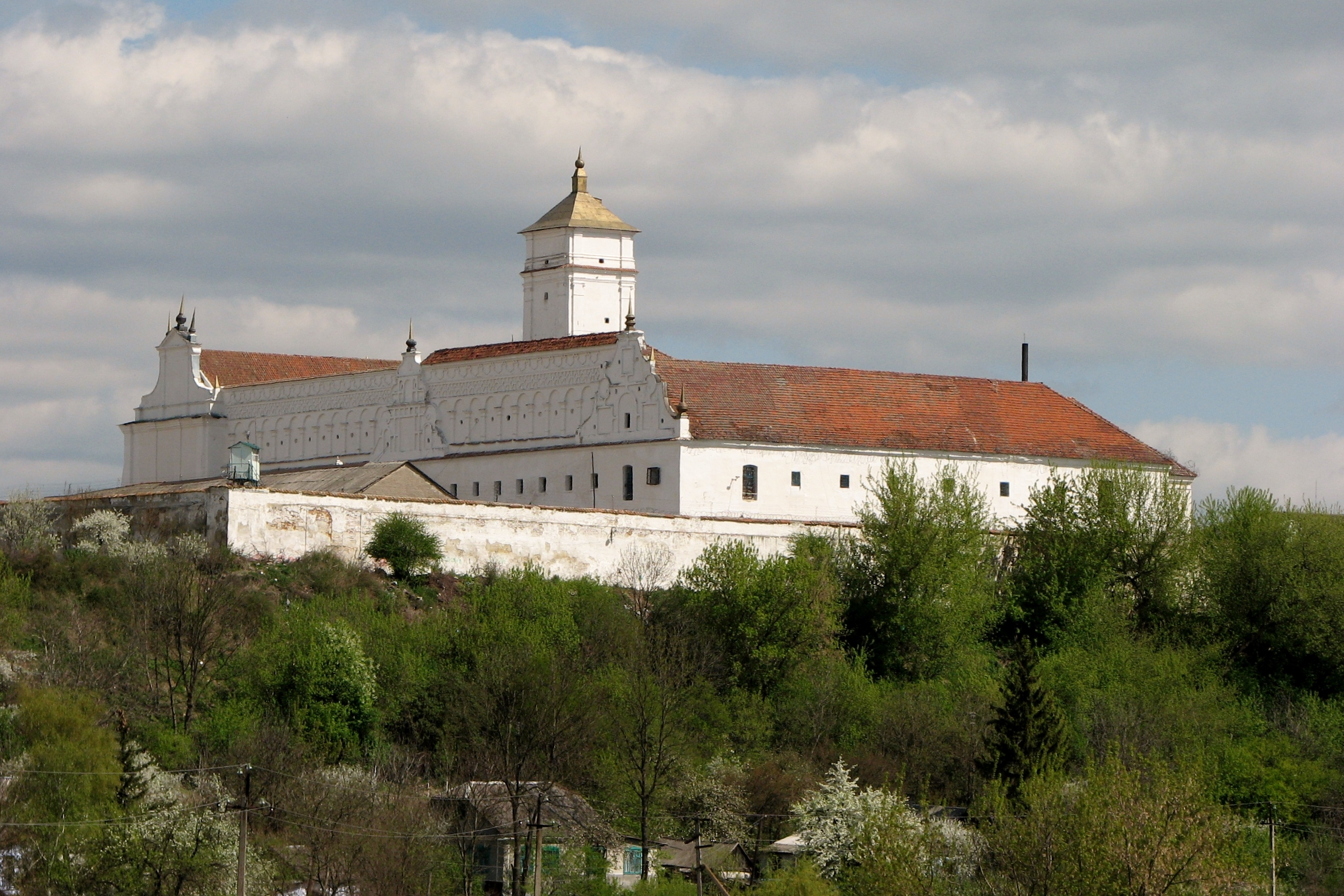
Church of St. Michael and Bernardine Monastery

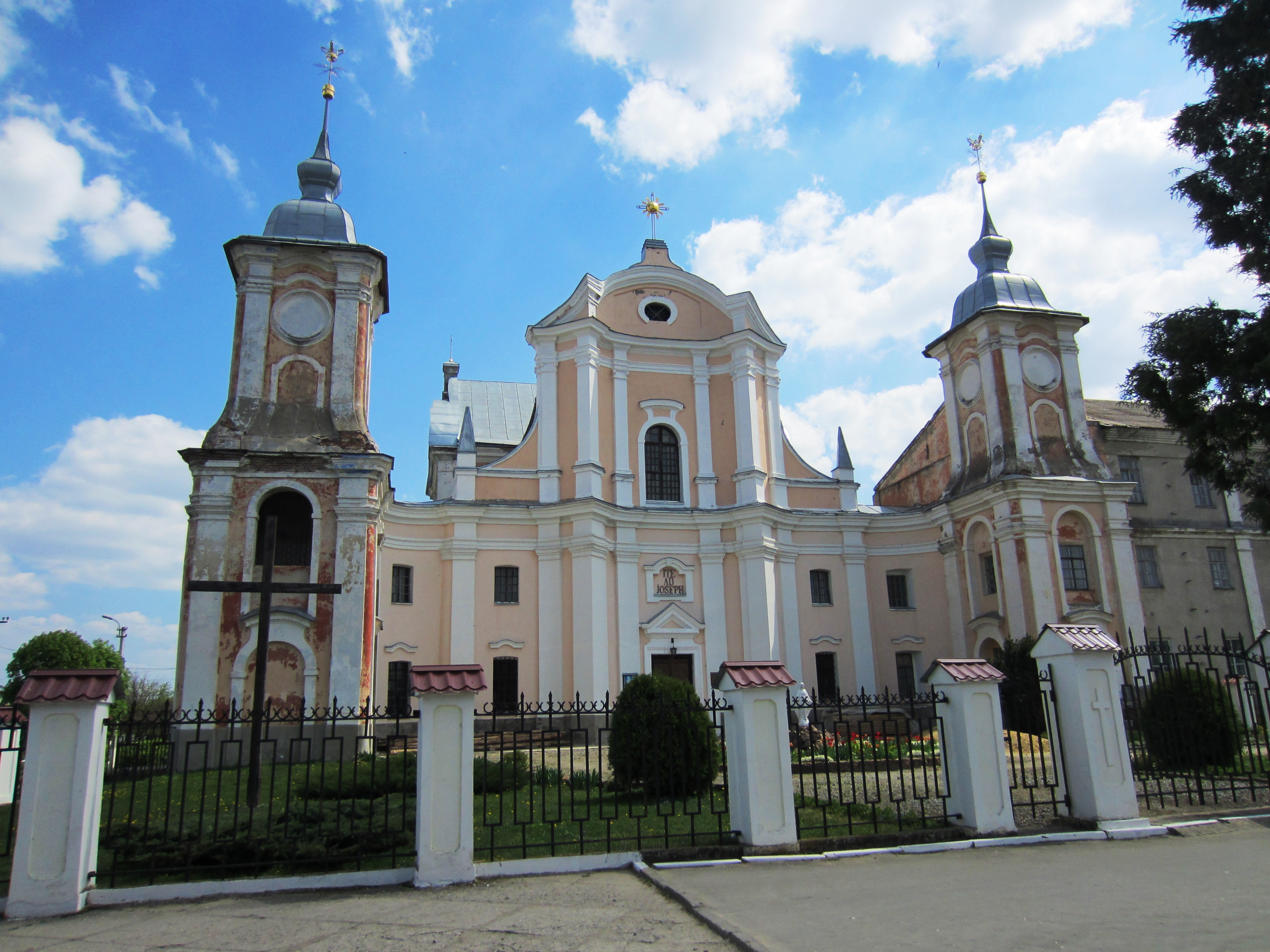
Church of St. Joseph and Lazarists Monastery

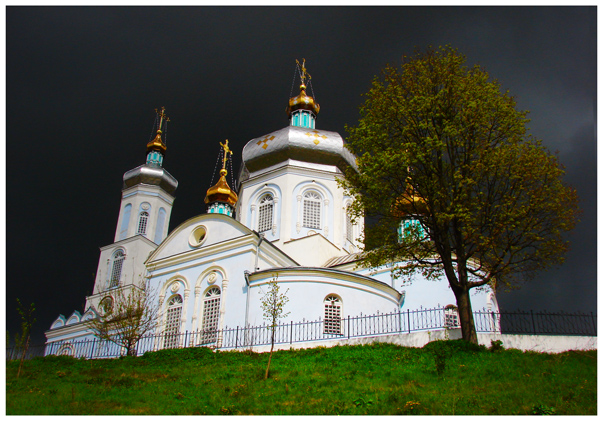
Church of Nativity

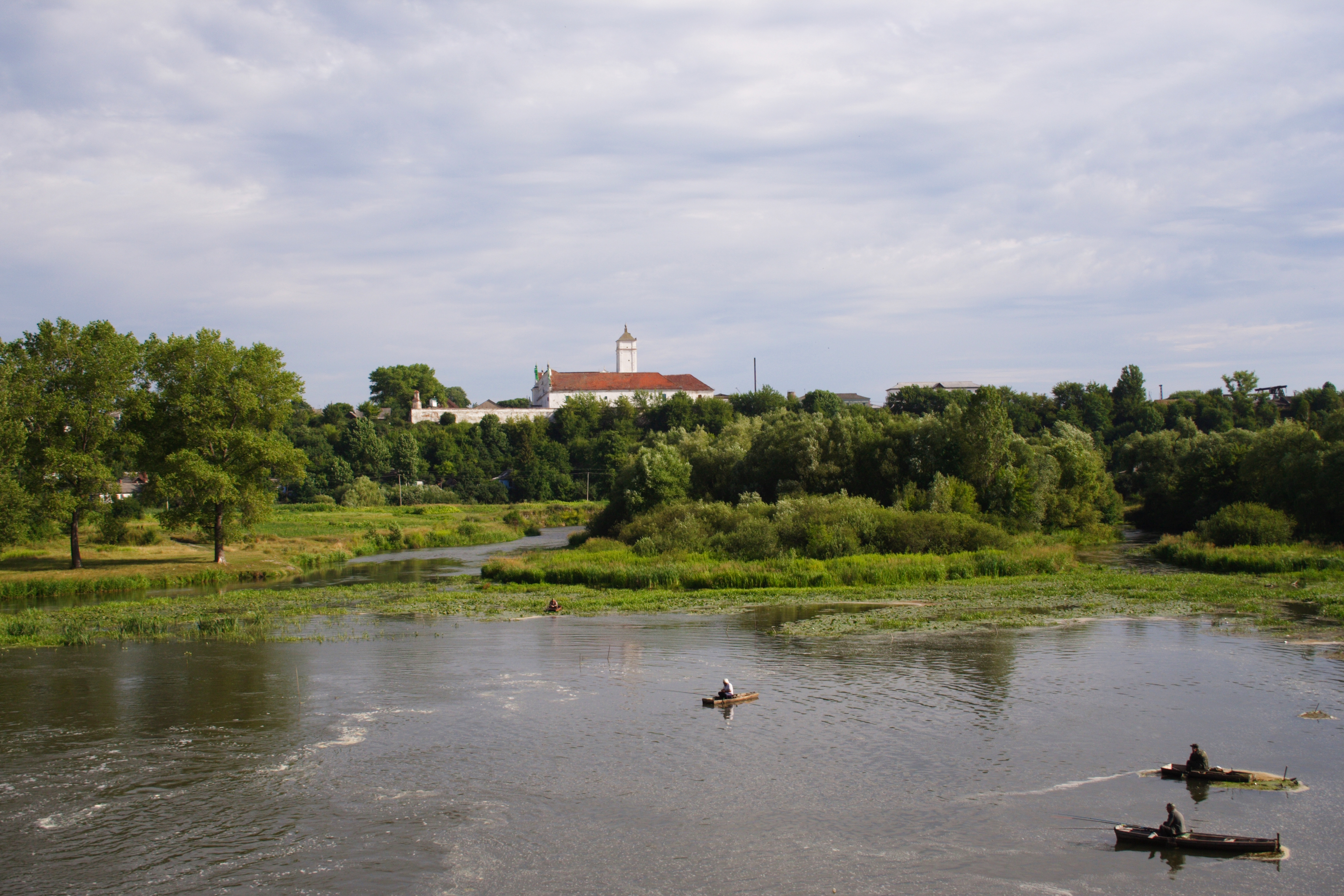
Horyn River in the city

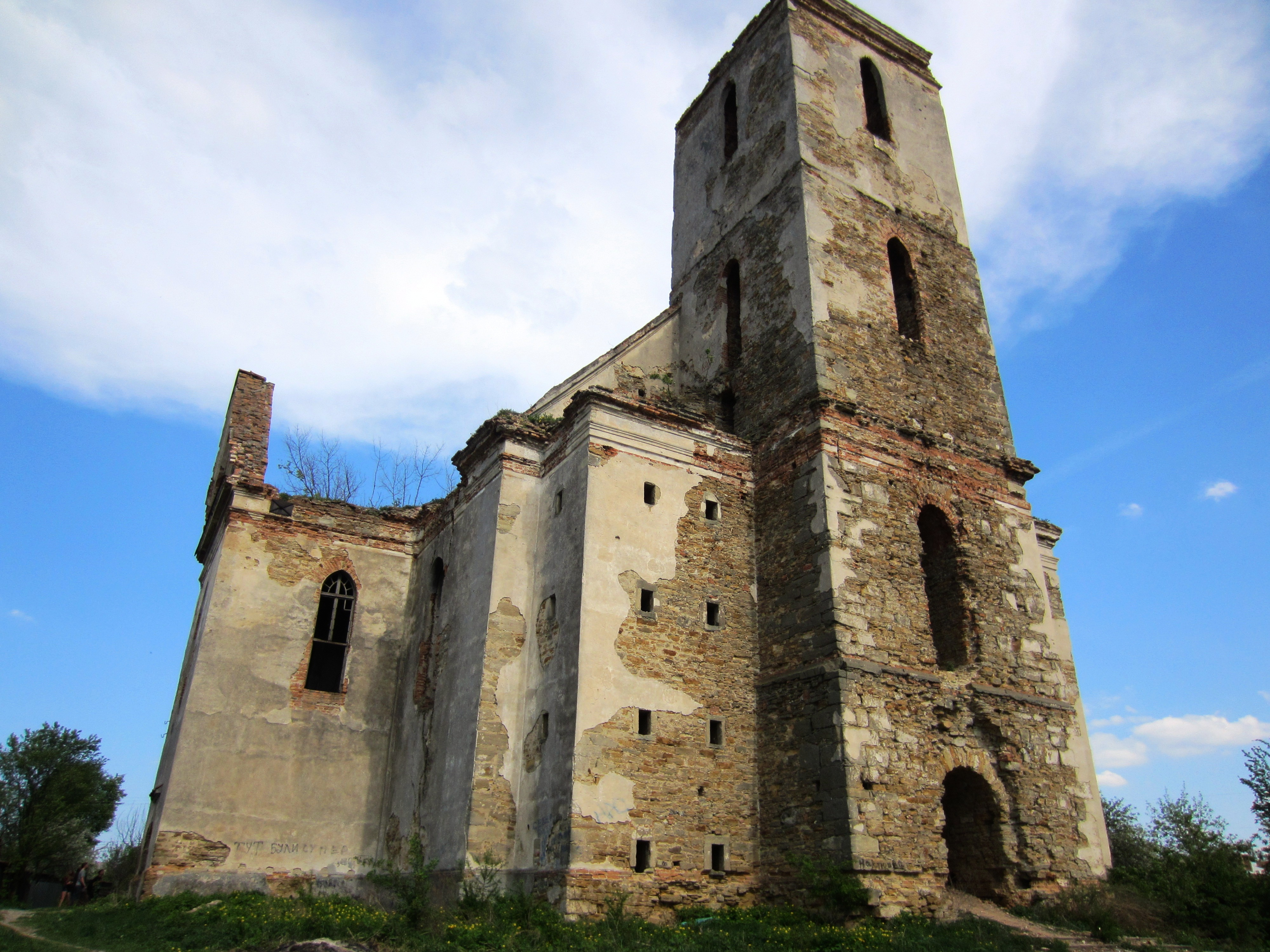
St. John Cathedral

== Notable people ==
- Anatoliy Aleksandrov (born 1951), rector of the Bauman University, Moscow
- Dmytro Chyhrynskyi (born 1986), Ukrainian professional footballer
- Marian Karol Dubiecki (1838–1926), Polish historian
- Paolo Fontana (1696–1765), Italian-Polish Baroque architect
- Nathan ben Moses Hannover (17th century), Ruthenian Jewish historian, Talmudist, and kabbalist
- Bill Mazer (1920–2013), American television and radio personality
- Eugene Nakonechny (b. 1914 in Iziaslav; d. 1988 in the US), architect and artist
- Leonard Nimoy (1931–2015), American actor (played Spock in Star Trek); parents born in Iziaslav, emigrated to Boston, USA
- Myroslav Popovych (1930–2018), Ukrainian philosopher
- Tzvi Tzur (1923–2004), Israeli officer, IDF Chief of Staff (1961–1963)
- Aleksander Zasławski (died 1629), Polish-Lithuanian noble, voivode of Bracław
- Władysław Dominik Zasławski (c. 1616–1656), Polish nobleman of Ruthenian stock, prince of the princely houses of Poland
