= Iziaslav IV of Kiev =

Grand Prince of Kiev in 1235

Iziaslav IV Vladimirovich
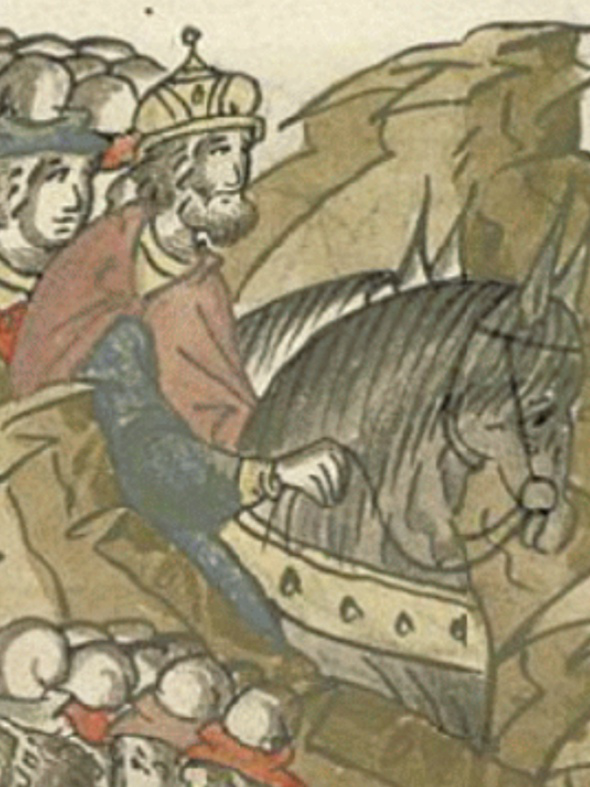
- Portrait of Izyaslav IV, miniature from the Illustrated Chronicle of Ivan the Terrible (16th century)
- Father: Vladimir III Igorevich

Iziaslav IV Vladimirovich (Note: Russian: Изяслав Владимирович; Ukrainian: Ізяслав Володимирович) (1186 – fl. 1236) was Prince of Terebovl' (1210), Novgorod-Seversk (until 1235) and Grand Prince of Kiev (1235–1236). He was the son of Vladimir Igorevich.

Iziaslav Vladimirovich was an Igorevich (descendant of Igor Sviatoslavich) and a member of a cadet branch of the Ol'govichi (descendants of Oleg Sviatoslavich). According to the Hypatian Chronicle, in 1234, Vladimirovich, with the help of the nomadic Polovtsy, campaigned against Vladimir Riurikovich and Daniil Romanovich of Volyn' and Galich. He defeated them near Torchesk, taking Vladimir prisoner. In the year 1235, Iziaslav IV marched from Kamenets with Mikhail Vsevelodovich, the Poles, the Russians, and the Polovtsy marched against Daniil again but were unsuccessful. According to the Novgorod First Chronicle, Prince Iziaslav and the Polovtsy joined Mikhail and troops from Chernigov to successfully attack and capture Kiev. After the victory, Iziaslav took the title of Grand Prince.

The Hypatian Chronicle and the Novgorod Chronicle disagree on which princes replaced each other in Kiev between 1235 and 1236. The Hypatian Chronicle states that Iaroslav Vsebelodovich took Kiev from Vladimir who was replaced by Mikail. The Novgorod Chronicle and, to a certain extent, the Nikon Chronicle, on the other hand, states that Iziaslav occupied Kiev after Vladimir was captured in 1235 implying that he replaced Iziaslav Mstislavich and not Vladimir.

== Notes ==
Preceded by Vladimir IV	Grand Prince of Kiev; 1235–1236	Succeeded by Yaroslav II
