= Aleksander Zasławski =

Polish-Lithuanian noble

Aleksander Zasławski (died 1629) was a Polish-Lithuanian noble, voivode of Bracław (died 1628) and voivode of Kiev (1628–1629).

In 1620 he inherited much wealth from his relative, Janusz Ostrogski.

He was a son of Janusz Zasławski and Aleksandra Sanguszko. He married Eufrozyna Ostrogska, and they had children including Władysław Dominik Zasławski, Franciszek Zasławski and Karol Zasławski.
