= Katarzyna Ostrogska =

Katarzyna Ostrogska was the name of several Polish–Lithuanian noblewomen:

- Katarzyna Ostrogska (1560–1579), wife of Krzysztof Mikołaj Radziwiłł
- Katarzyna Ostrogska (1602–1642), wife of Tomasz Zamoyski
