= Sieniawski =

Sieniawski coat of arms

Sieniawski is a Polish surname, it may refer to:

- Adam Hieronim Sieniawski (1576–1616), Polish–Lithuanian noble
- Adam Hieronim Sieniawski (1623–1650), Polish noble, starost of Lwów since 1648, Field Clerk of the Crown since 1649
- Adam Mikołaj Sieniawski (1666–1726), Polish noble (szlachcic), military leader
- Hieronim Jarosz Sieniawski (1516–1579), Polish noble
- Mikołaj Hieronim Sieniawski (1645–1683), Polish noble (szlachcic), military leader, politician
- Mikołaj Sieniawski (1489–1569), notable Polish magnate, military commander and politician
- Prokop Sieniawski (1602–1626), Polish noble

== See also ==
- Sieniawski family, Polish szlachta family
- Majdan Sieniawski, a village in the administrative district of Gmina Adamówka, Przeworsk County, Subcarpathian Voivodeship, in south-eastern Poland
