= Battle of Gwoździec =

- Part of Moldavian–Polish War (1530–1538)
Date	19 August 1531
Location	Gwoździec
Result	Polish victory

Belligerents
Moldavia	Kingdom of Poland

Commanders and leaders
Petru Rareș	Jan Amor Tarnowski

Strength
6,000	Unknown

Casualties and losses
2,000 killed 1,000 captured (executed after the battle)	Unknown

The Battle of Gwoździec was fought in 1531 as part of the Polish-Moldavian War.

== Background ==
Hospodar Petru Rareș on August 12 sent 6,000 cavalry from Chernivtsi to Pokuttia. under the command of the Chernivtsi Barnowski and Chocim Vlad perkulabs, with the intention of destroying the Polish troops located in Pokuttia and also capturing Gwoździec. This small wooden castle, the property of Hetman Tarnowski, was captured by the Moldavians in December 1530 during their expedition to Pokuttia. On August 3, 1531, during Tarnowski's retaliatory expedition, Gwoździec was attempted to be captured by Maciej Włodek from the march; forewarned by gunfire, the assault by Winged Hussars was repulsed. On August 4, the besiegers were joined by Zbigniew Slupecki, at the head of a 284-horse cavalry troop. After firing from gunpowers and bows, the cavalry broke into the fortifications breaking the defenders' resistance.

The capture of this center would open the way for the Moldavians to continue their operations already conducted by the hospodar's main army. The Moldavians, in an attempt to surprise the Gwoździec garrison, immediately headed for the village, wasting no time in capturing the castles they passed along the way. However, the surprise failed and they proceeded with a regular siege. The crew of Gwoździec consisted of at least 200 men under the command of Maciej Włodek.

Jan Amor Tarnowski, staying with the army in Bolszow, learned of the siege of Gwoździec on August 16 and, without waiting for artillery, immediately ordered a march out. The Hetman decided to go to the relief by the shortest route and decided to force his way across the Dniester.

On the night of August 18–19, the Crown army arrived in Obertyn. After a short rest, they set off in a southeastern direction. They stopped only at the Czerniawa crossing, at the place where the village of Winograd is located today. From there, approaches were made to get an idea of the situation under the castle. Tarnowski decided to attack the Moldavians immediately. Barnowski and Vlad neglected to provide insurance, and did not know that there were Polish troops in their rear.

The position of Tarnowski's troops was not very good. They were separated from the enemy by a forest, and it was necessary to push through the swampy Cherniava River to be able to enter one of the roads. The enemy could have attacked the stretched Crown troops from the forest at any time and pushed them into Cherniava. Tarnowski chose the safer western road, which bypassed Gwoździec from the north and provided an opportunity to spring back and develop the formation on the flatland in the event of an enemy attack. The Moldavians, wanting to push the Polish banners into the woods, would be forced to attack uphill, surrounding the Polish array from the west. Tarnowski decided to tie up the enemy with fighting with his advance guard until the rest of the army came out into the open space and developed the formation. The flags of Janusz Swiecicki and Aleksander Sieniawski and Jan Herburt were assigned to this task. A total of 386 horsemen.

== The battle ==
Swiecicki crossed the Cherniava River and, having covered a distance of 4 kilometers, came out into the open where he developed an array. The Moldavians besieging the castle were attacked. A fight ensued, the Poles began to retreat, having crushed kicks they did not risk another attack.The retreat could have turned into a retreat, so Swiecicki sent a messenger to hasten the march of the rest of the army. The first to appear was field guard Mikolaj Sieniawski leading 330 horsemen, he struck at the Moldavians and pushed them slightly towards the besieged castle, the attack was also renewed by Swiecicki. Barnowski and Vlad proceeded to counterattack, several attacks by the Moldavian cavalry failed and were repulsed. More Polish banners arrived on the battlefield, which immediately entered the fray.

The Moldavians, seeing the changing situation on the battlefield, began to stir and retreat, at the same time Wlodek's flagship made an advance from the castle to the enemy's rear. Panic broke into the Moldavian army, having their retreat cut off, they threw themselves into flight. The Hetman sent after them in pursuit of the light riding banners which chased the enemy all the way to the Moldavian border.

In the battle, the Moldovans lost 2,000 men and 1,000 were taken as prisoners, whom Tarnowski ordered to behead, as he did not want to diminish his forces by setting out an escort for the prisoners. On the other hand, keeping them in a Polish camp near the Moldovan border would be, as he wrote, nothing more than "keeping a snake in its own bosom."

== Aftermath ==
After the battle, the Poles set up camp near Gwoździec. The castle was supplied with food, equipment and crew, and then, not expecting another enemy attack, the retreat began. On August 21, the hetman and his army reached the village of Obertyn, where they set up camp, and the next day there was to be a decisive battle with the main army of Hospodar Raresz.
