= Moldavian–Polish War (1530–1538) =

Moldavian-Polish War (1530–1538)
- Part of the Moldavian–Polish Wars
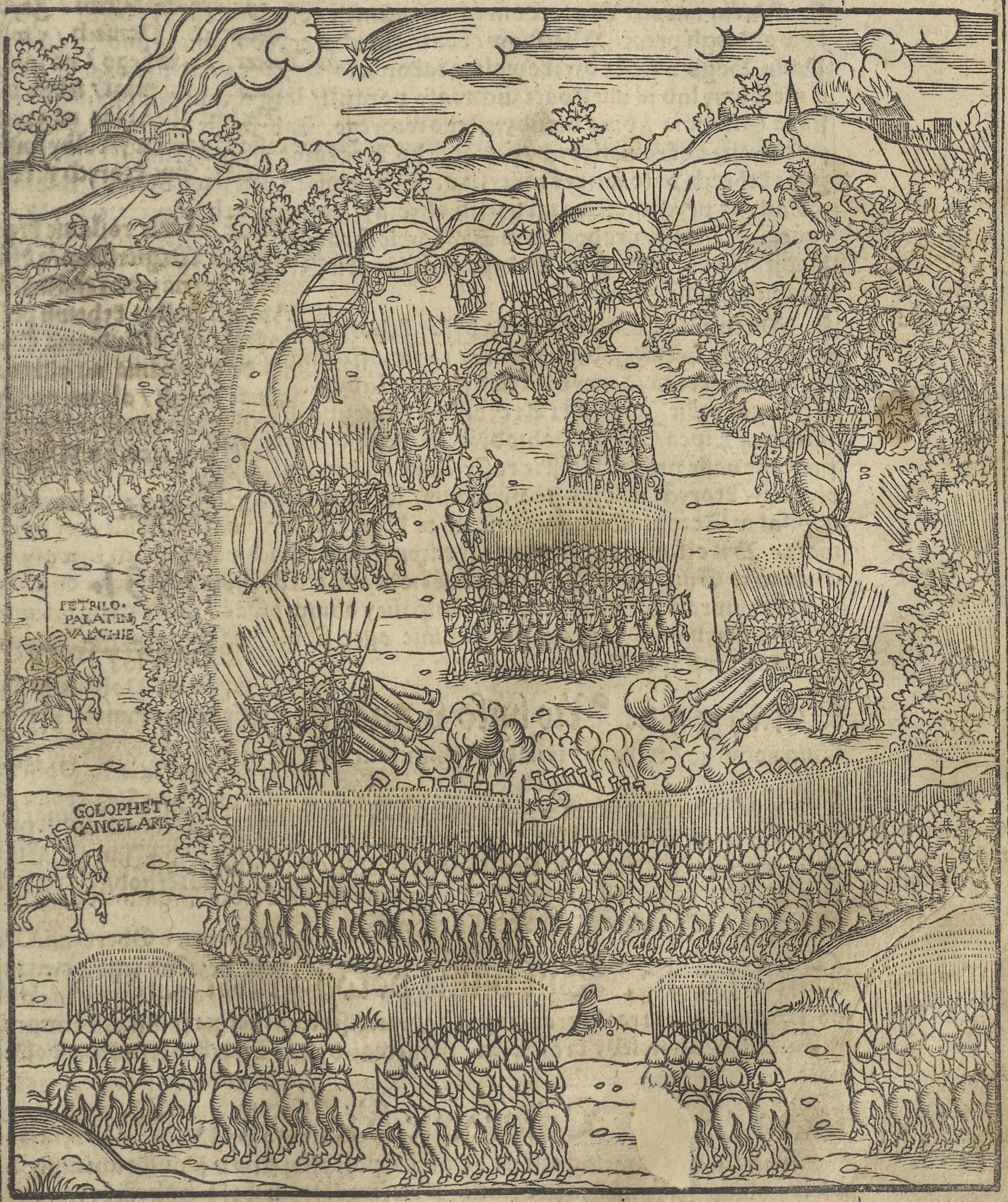
- Battle of Obertyn (1531)
Date	1530–1538
Location	Pokuttia, Kingdom of Poland
Result	Polish victory

Belligerents
Kingdom of Poland	Moldavia

Commanders and leaders
Sigismund I Jan Amor Tarnowski; Mikołaj Sieniawski; Andrzej Tęczyński	Petru Rareș

Strength
1531: 5,619; 1538: 6,000	1531: 17,000; 1538: 20,000

Casualties and losses
1531: 256 killed 1538: 900 killed Many captured	1531: 7,746 killed 1,000 captured 1538: Unknown

The Moldavian–Polish War of 1530-1538 was an armed conflict between Moldavia and the Kingdom of Poland over Pokuttia, a small land on today's Ukrainian-Romanian border. The war ended with a Polish victory after the Battle of Obertyn in 1531 and the signing of a peace treaty in which Pokuttia remained part of Poland. However, Moldavian Hospodar Petru Rareș did not give up, invading Podolia in 1538 defeating the Polish army at Seret, but he was unable to achieve greater success and withdrew to Moldavia which ended the war.

== Background ==
After the defeat of John I Albert's Moldavian expedition, who wanted to regain the fief of the Moldavian Hospodardom lost to the Ottoman Empire, in 1499 Poland came to terms with the loss of the Moldavian fief. In 1503 Stephen III the Great entered Pokuttia with his army, to which he claimed rights. However, seven years later, this borderland returned to Poland, following the signing of a peace treaty between King Sigismund I the Old and the hospodar Bogdan III the One-Eyed. Under its terms, Moldova gained independence from Poland, but weakened by ravaging wars, it had to recognize Ottoman sovereignty and pay tribute to the sultan.

Pokuttia was the southernmost point of the Kingdom of Poland, and was part of the Ruthenian voivodeship. Pokuttia was located in the Halych Land, which consisted of four districts: halych, trembowla, śniatyński and kolomyjski. Pokuttia covered 7,000 square kilometers. The area was inhabited, in the first half of the 16th century, by 30,000 people. There were 13 towns and 150 villages in the area in 1531.

The issue of Pokuttia came to life in 1527, when, after the death of his nephew Stephen IV of Moldavia, Petru Rareș took the Moldavian throne. He sought to restore the country's high international standing as in his father's time, that is, to create a Greater Moldavia. He wanted to achieve this by becoming independent from Ottomans and tying himself to an alliance with the Grand Duchy of Moscow and the Habsburgs. Conquering Pokuttia was to be only a milestone to achieving the main goal. Poland viewed Rareș's foreign policy with growing concern. One of the imperatives of the Polish national interest was not to allow Habsburgs to merge with Muscovites, and now there was an additional problem in the form of a new southern member of the anti-Jagiellonian coalition. Polish elites were reluctant to strike preemptively at Moldavia because they feared repercussions from the Ottoman side, and fresh in their minds was the memory of the defeat of the Hungarians at the Battle of Mohacs in 1526, in which king Louis II of Hungary and virtually the entire army were killed, leading to the political decay of Hungary.

Rares hoped that fear of Ottomans would guarantee his passivity in the face of his annexation of Pokuttia, and in the summer of 1530 he requested the return of these lands, arguing that they were part of Moldavia. At the same time, he sent troops to begin attacking the Polish troops guarding the borderlands, and when the waters of the Dniester and Prut fall, they were to cross them.

== Battle of Gwoździec (1531) ==
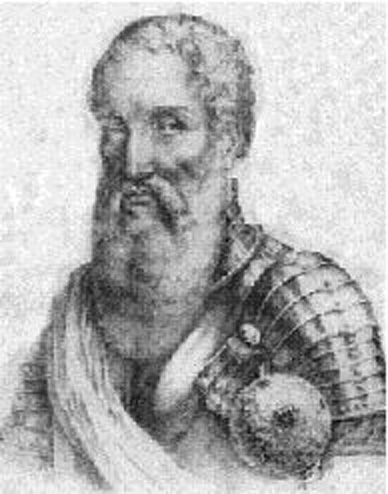
Jan Amor Tarnowski

Hospodar Petru Rareș on August 12 sent 6,000 cavalry from Chernivtsi to Pokuttia. under the command of the Chernivtsi Barnowski and Chocim Vlad perkulabs, with the intention of destroying the Polish troops located in Pokuttia and also capturing Gwoździec. This small wooden castle, the property of Hetman Tarnowski, was captured by the Moldavians in December 1530 during their expedition to Pokuttia. On August 3, 1531, during Tarnowski's retaliatory expedition, Gwoździec was attempted to be captured by Maciej Włodek from the march; forewarned by gunfire, the assault by Winged Hussars was repulsed. On August 4, the besiegers were joined by Zbigniew Slupecki, at the head of a 284-horse cavalry troop. After firing from gunpowers and bows, the cavalry broke into the fortifications breaking the defenders' resistance.

The capture of this center would open the way for the Moldavians to continue their operations already conducted by the hospodar's main army. The Moldavians, in an attempt to surprise the Gwoździec garrison, immediately headed for the village, wasting no time in capturing the castles they passed along the way. However, the surprise failed and they proceeded with a regular siege. The crew of Gwoździec consisted of at least 200 men under the command of Maciej Włodek.

Jan Amor Tarnowski, staying with the army in Bolszow, learned of the siege of Gwoździec on August 16 and, without waiting for artillery, immediately ordered a march out. The Hetman decided to go to the relief by the shortest route and decided to force his way across the Dniester.

On the night of August 18–19, the Crown army arrived in Obertyn. After a short rest, they set off in a southeastern direction. They stopped only at the Czerniawa crossing, at the place where the village of Winograd is located today. From there, approaches were made to get an idea of the situation under the castle. Tarnowski decided to attack the Moldavians immediately. Barnowski and Vlad neglected to provide insurance, and did not know that there were Polish troops in their rear.

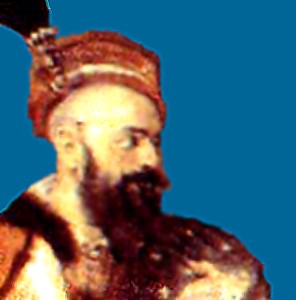
Mikołaj Sieniawski

The position of Tarnowski's troops was not very good. They were separated from the enemy by a forest, and it was necessary to push through the swampy Cherniava River to be able to enter one of the roads. The enemy could have attacked the stretched Crown troops from the forest at any time and pushed them into Cherniava. Tarnowski chose the safer western road, which bypassed Gwoździec from the north and provided an opportunity to spring back and develop the formation on the flatland in the event of an enemy attack. The Moldavians, wanting to push the Polish banners into the woods, would be forced to attack uphill, surrounding the Polish array from the west. Tarnowski decided to tie up the enemy with fighting with his advance guard until the rest of the army came out into the open space and developed the formation. The flags of Janusz Swiecicki and Aleksander Sieniawski and Jan Herburt were assigned to this task. A total of 386 horsemen.

Swiecicki crossed the Cherniava River and, having covered a distance of 4 kilometers, came out into the open where he developed an array. The Moldavians besieging the castle were attacked. A fight ensued, the Poles began to retreat, having crushed kicks they did not risk another attack. The retreat could have turned into a retreat, so Swiecicki sent a messenger to hasten the march of the rest of the army. The first to appear was field guard Mikolaj Sieniawski leading 330 horsemen, he struck at the Moldavians and pushed them slightly towards the besieged castle, the attack was also renewed by Swiecicki. Barnowski and Vlad proceeded to counterattack, several attacks by the Moldavian cavalry failed and were repulsed. More Polish banners arrived on the battlefield, which immediately entered the fray.

The Moldavians, seeing the changing situation on the battlefield, began to stir and retreat, at the same time Wlodek's flagship made an advance from the castle to the enemy's rear. Panic broke into the Moldavian army, having their retreat cut off, they threw themselves into flight. The Hetman sent after them in pursuit of the light riding banners which chased the enemy all the way to the Moldavian border.

In the battle, the Moldovans lost 2,000 men and 1,000 were taken as prisoners, whom Tarnowski ordered to behead, as he did not want to diminish his forces by setting out an escort for the prisoners. On the other hand, keeping them in a Polish camp near the Moldovan border would be, as he wrote, nothing more than "keeping a snake in its own bosom."

After the battle, the Poles set up camp near Gwoździec. They supplied the castle with food, equipment and crew after which, not expecting another enemy attack, they began a retreat. On August 21, the hetman and his army reached the village of Obertyn where they set up camp, the next day a decisive battle was to take place with the main army of hospodar Rareș.

== Battle of Obertyn (1531) ==
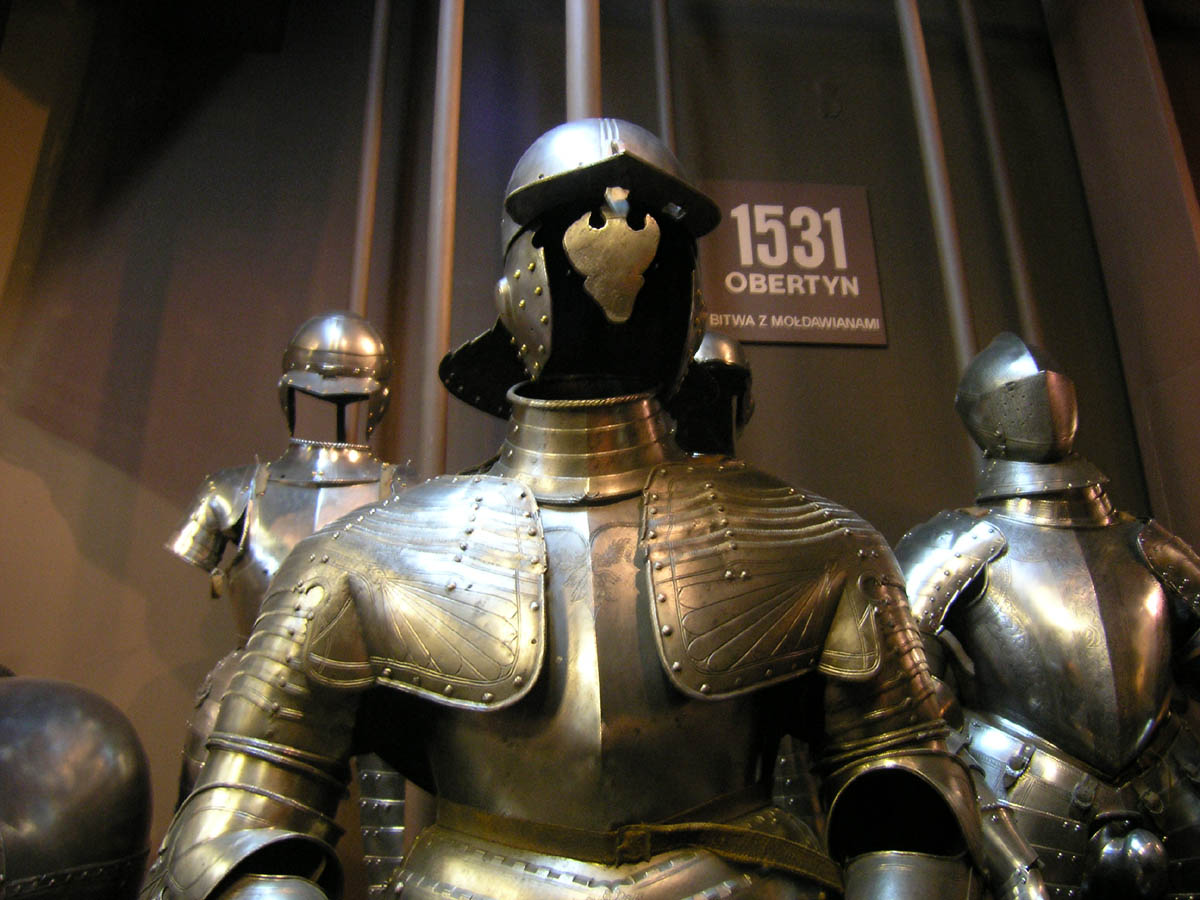
Polish armoury from the battle of Obertyn

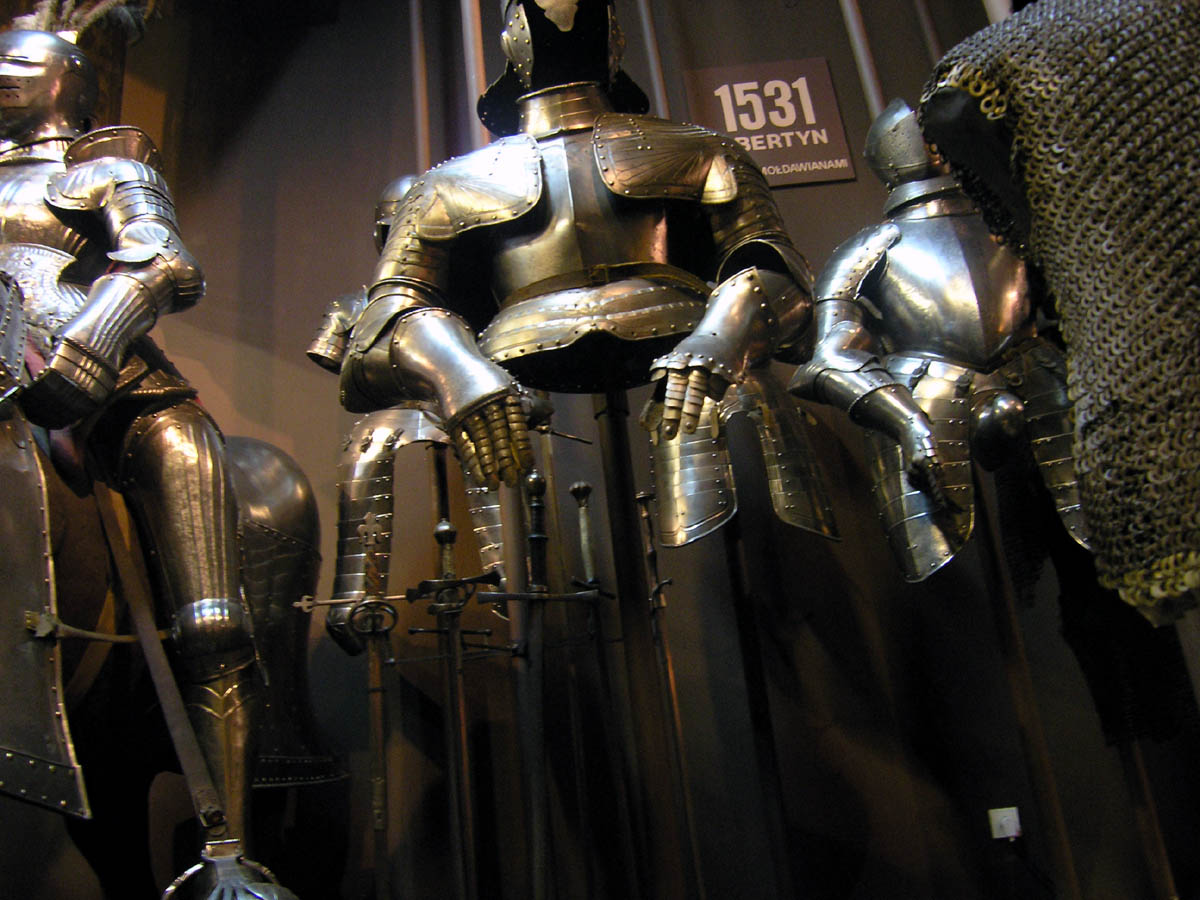
Polish armoury from the battle of Obertyn

The news that Petru Rareș's army was advancing behind him reached the Hetman on August 21, just as he finished writing a letter to the king, in which he reported the recent victory. Tarnowski took the envelope from the messenger Zbigniew Sienieński with the words: "I don't want you to leave already, because I hope in God that we will beat this crowd of enemies as well, and then you will hang doubly auspicious news." He also immediately ordered the camp to be moved to a flat hill with sides of 2×0.5 kilometers by the road from Obertyn to Chocimierz, two kilometers away to the north. The place was chosen perfectly, because the enemy had to storm the Polish positions going uphill and could not maneuver the cavalry efficiently. The position from the north was supported by a sizable forest, making entrapment impossible. At the top of the hill a stockade was rolled: the wagons were arranged in a rectangle and chained together, but leaving two movable gates, the first facing the enemy, i.e. from the southwest - Obertyn, and the second rear gate from the northwest, leading to Chocimierz. The longer flanks numbered 100 wagons lined up with drawbars to the center, the shorter 25 wagons. The entire camp was dug in and entanglements were set up, and all artillery was located in the southeastern corner of the stockade, where the main assault was expected.

The enemy appeared around 9 a.m. on August 22, 1531, letting Obertyn go up in smoke and slowly developing a semicircle encircling the Polish army from southwest to northeast. Some time later, the Poles began firing artillery. From a captive, the hetman learned that the entire army of Rares was in front of him. He immediately convened a meeting, during which he presented the situation to the commanders; the captains urged the commander to retreat. Tarnowski resolutely opposed the captains. In an impassioned speech to those gathered, he encouraged them to fight and convinced them of the possibility of victory, and concluded by saying: "Here I will beat the enemy or die bravely."

Rares sent scouts near the Polish camp hoping that this would provoke the hetman to leave the camp and fight a battle on the field. Tarnowski, however, did not accept the challenge and ordered Jan Staszkowski, senior over the cannon (commander of the field artillery), to repel them with artillery fire, which caused some losses in the ranks of the hospodar's troops. After a while, Moldavian cannons, whose fire was directed by a Catholic priest from Transylvania, were rolled up and firing began. A mutual exchange of fire began the battle. The bombardment of the Polish camp, which lasted several hours, caused considerable losses and contributed to the growing impatience of the army. Despite this, the hetman waited pantiently for the enemy's movement, strolling around the camp reassuring the soldiers and commanders. At the end of the artillery duel, when he was at the frontline huffer, he nearly died when a cannonball killed an infantryman right next to him.

During the bombardment, Rares ordered the encirclement of the stockade from the side of the forest, fearing that the Poles would flee through the wilderness under cover of darkness and take away his victory. Tarnowski, seeing these actions, decided to provoke the enemy. At his command, 850 infantrymen with rifles formed a formation and came out through the rear gate. The Hospodar threw three thousand light cavalry into the charge to smash the Polish unit. The infantry allowed the Moldavian cavalry to short distance and only then showered them with shells inflicting serious losses, and then returned to camp. Rares understood this action as an attempt to win a retreating route to Chocimierz and Halicz, so he sent more cavalry flags into battle. In this situation, the hetman ordered Andrzej Trojanowski, Stanislaw Balicki and Janusz Swiecicki, the commanders of the general's huff, to strike at the Moldavians through the rear gate. Balicki in a force of 700 horses, moved forward. At its head lined up the spearmen, followed by the hussars. The spearmen lined up between the horses of the hussars, in the third line the riflemen lined up.

The Polish cavalry moved slowly, but a few dozen meters in front of the enemy, they went into a rush. Above the heads of the spearmen and hussars, archers constantly fired, releasing up to 10 arrows per minute. The Moldavians also showered the Poles with arrows, but they did little harm to the horsemen clad in full armor and the horses shielded by metal plates. After a while, the Poles struck at the enemy formation completely crushing the first lines, then, after crushing the spearmen's, they reached for swords and sabers, and riflemen also joined the fight. Poorly armed and devoid of armor, the horsemen of the hospodar had no chance against the trained army, which inflicted more and more losses on them, but nevertheless new troops kept arriving in place of those killed. Unable to break through the enemy, which was many times more numerous, Balicki retreated. Its place was taken by the troops of Janusz Swiecicki, Hipolit Mlodecki and Andrzej Trojanowski, but they too failed to break through the Moldavians. After a while, Balicki returned to the battle rearmed and supported by reinforcement led by field guard Mikolaj Sieniawski. However, the threefold charge due to the large numerical superiority of Rares's troops did not yield results.

The Hospodar was sure that the Poles' charges were aimed at forcing a way of retreat, so he ordered all his forces to block their way to Chocimierz. This is what Tarnowski was waiting for. Seeing the enemy forces entangled in a protracted battle on the northeastern side of the camp, he threw the entire frontal huff, still reinforced by reinforcements, through the front gate to attack the Moldavian right wing. First, Nikolai Iskrzycki's rifle division fell out, which, after showering the enemy with arrows, scattered to the flanks, giving space for the spearmen and hussars to attack, at the same time the artillery in the wagon began firing. Completely surprised, the Moldavians went into disarray, and the Poles rushing after them reached the road leading to Obertyn and cut off their retreat. The groups of the hospodar's cavalry, which had been broken up, were cut to pieces by hussars and riflemen. Rotmistrz Aleksander Sieniawski seized almost all of the enemy's artillery, which the Moldavian cavalry wanted to take back after a while, but this was prevented by an infantry unit sent by the hetman.

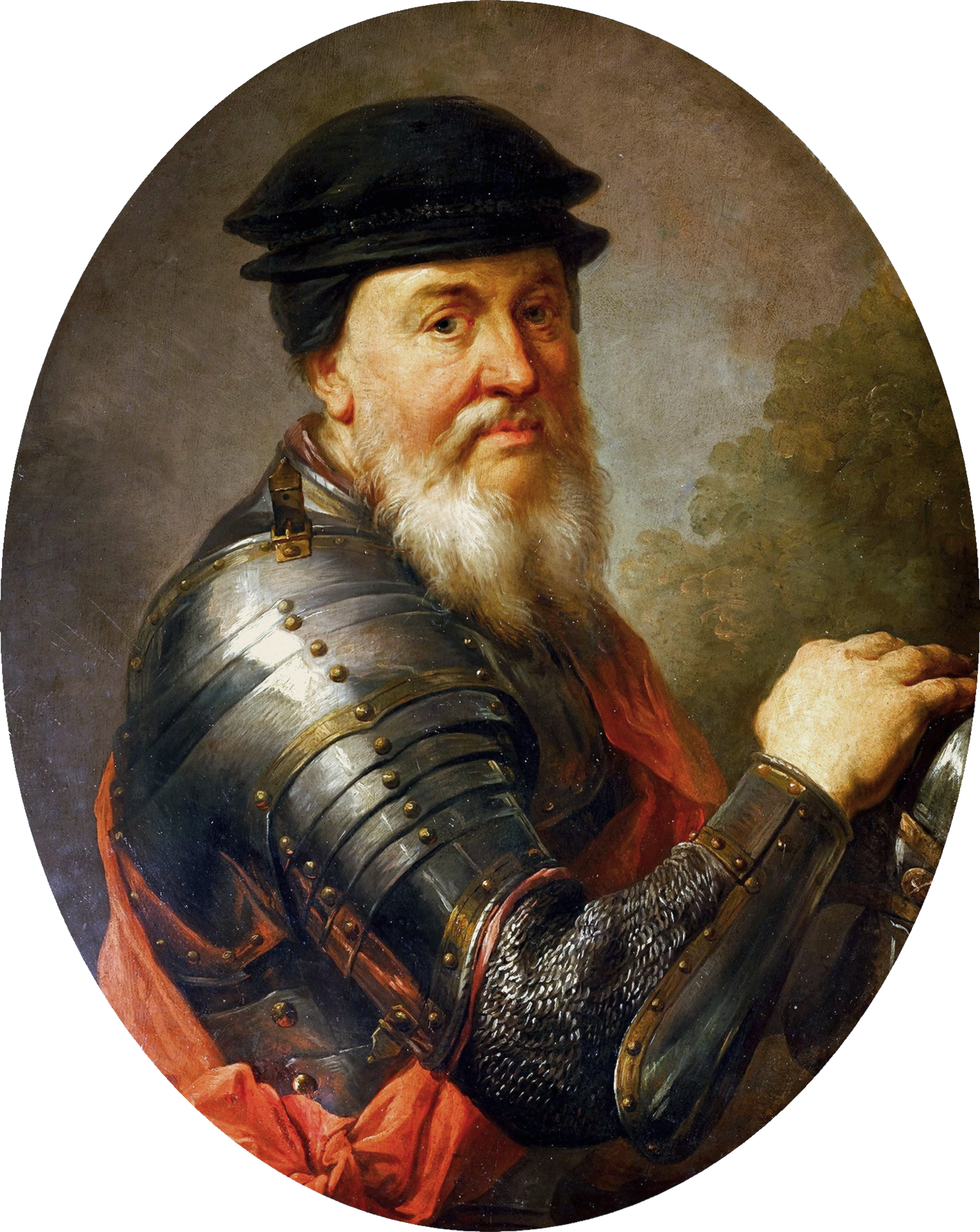
Hetman Jan Amor Tarnowski

After a while, the Polish cannoneers turned the captured cannons towards the center of Rareş, which they began to fire from the flanks. In this situation, the shattered right wing of Rareş's army threw itself into retreat, while the left wing defended itself, but increasingly weakly. When the Hetman threw the remaining in reserves huffer onto the center, supported by part of the forces of the frontal huffer (the rest of the frontal huffer threw itself into pursuit of the Moldavians' fleeing right wing), the Moldavian center, seeing the left wing wavering and, crumbled. Around 2pm the battle ended. Twice wounded, Raresh, at the head of a small post, fled toward Moldavia. A pursuit was immediately undertaken after him, but it lasted only 10 kilometers to the Moldavian–Polish border, which Tarnowski's soldiers were not allowed to cross.

In what was most likely a five-hour battle, 7,746 Moldovans fell, including 2,746 under the wagon alone, and about a thousand were taken prisoner (including Moldavian Chancellor Theodore, the court viceroy Popescula, seven members of the boyar council and eighteen other significant boyars). The Poles also captured the entire Moldavian camp, fifty cannons and three banners, including one given to Raresh by the Sultan, which was captured by Jerzy Kalinowski. On the Polish side 256 soldiers were killed, many were wounded.

After the battle, the hetman sang a thanksgiving "Te Deum" with the army, and then spoke to his comrades, thanking them on behalf of the king for their sacrifice. Two days after the battle, on August 24, Tarnowski rolled up camp and headed for Poland, leaving a corps of only three hundred cavalry and few infantry in Pokuttia.

== Peace treaty ==
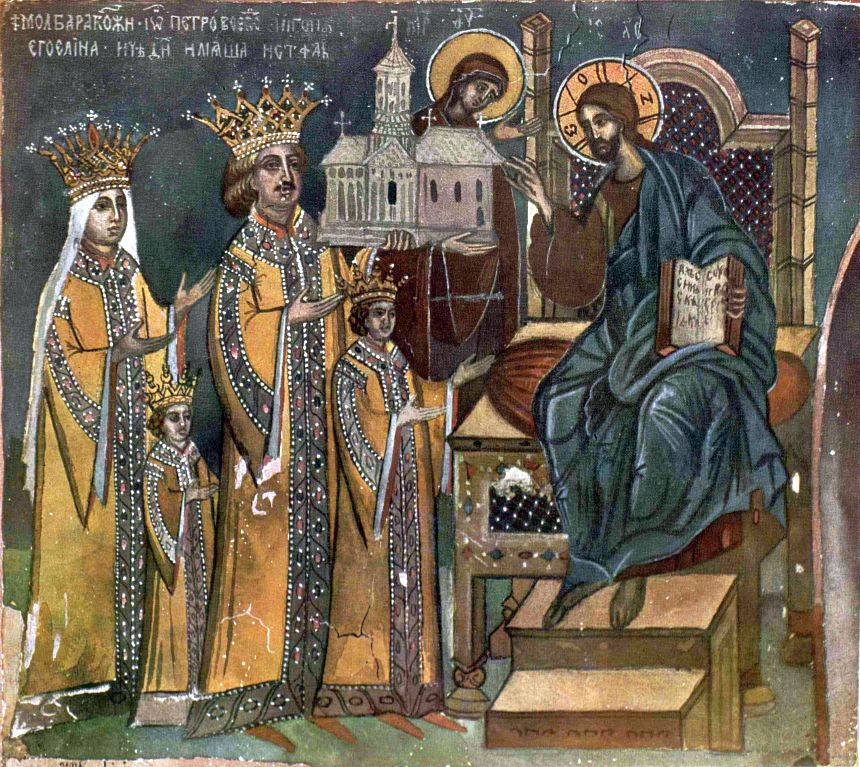
Petru Rares

In September, a deputy of Rareş arrived in Tarnowski's camp, explaining that the whole war was a misunderstanding. He explained to the Hetman that Pokuttia was Moldavian property, and Petru Rares had only claimed his own and occupied it, but when the Sultan ordered him to withdraw, he did so, but left a few garrisons to guard the inhabitants from bandits before the Polish forces arrived. Meanwhile, the Poles attacked these guards, then the hospodar responded with the same. The envoy demanded the release of the captives and the return of the cannons. Tarnowski was not fooled by this ebullient diplomacy. He wrote a letter to Rares, in which he extensively described the history of Pokuttia and refused to give up his war gains.

On November 7, 1531, Tarnowski arrived in Krakow, where crowds of townspeople and clergy greeted him in front of the walls. Conquered banners were carried and the most notable captives, out of nearly a thousand, were released away. Particularly noteworthy were the fifty conquered cannons. At Wawel Castle, the winner was greeted by King Sigismund l himself, who rose from his seat and walked halfway down the hall to meet Tarnowski. The next day, the conquered banners were hung in Wawel Cathedral, next to those of Grunwald.

The war over Pokuttia ended with a truce, concluded on February 20, 1532. However, in order to permanently secure the southern flank of the Polish-Lithuanian Commonwealth in 1533, King Sigismund I decided to make peace with Sultan Suleiman I. The deal also defended the Polish state from Moldavian blackmail by Ottoman intervention.

== Renewal of the conflict ==
This policy of the two countries marked the beginning of the end of Rareş's aspirations. Nevertheless, he tried to act further. He unsuccessfully sought support from Emperor Ferdinand I, and renewed his alliance with Moscow. Wanting to cause a Polish-Ottoman war, he harassed the Polish borderlands with minor attacks. The failure to capitalize politically and militarily on the victory at the Battle of Obertyn (August 22, 1531) caused the struggle for Pokuttia with Petru Rareş to continue for almost seven more years. Moldavian invasions in August and winter 1535 and February 1536 caused King Sigismund the Old to decide to end the problems on the Moldavian border. In January 1537, during the Sejm of Kraków, the number of potentate defenses was increased, on February 19 war was declared against Rareş by convening a mass movement for July 2. Trembwola was designated as the rallying point of the noble army. However, major military actions did not take place, this was caused by the nobles' revolt near Lviv (Chicken war), so offensive actions were abandoned. At the Moldavian border operated a 2,000-strong cavalry corps of common defense under the command of Mikolaj Sieniawski and the castellan of Połaniec, Andrzej Tęczyński. In November 1537, Sieniawski entered Moldavia and ravaged and burned the border towns of Chernivtsi, Botosani and nearby villages.

== Battle of Seret (1538) ==
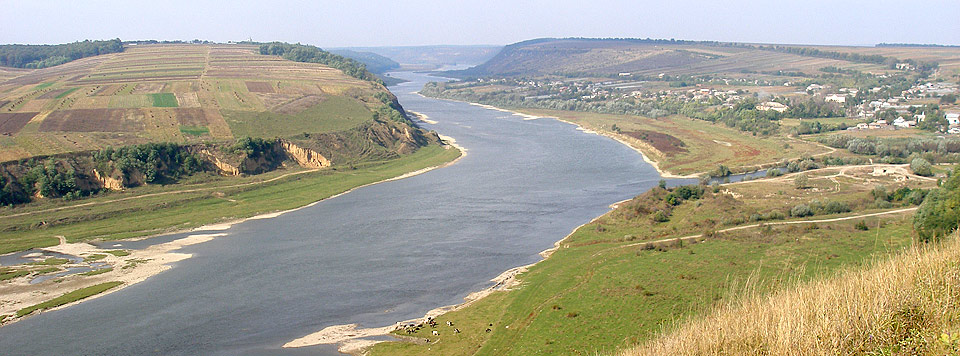
River Seret

In January 1538, Raresh carried out a retaliatory expedition and, at the head of a 20,000-strong army, invaded Podolia, destroyed Czerwone, Jagielnica and many villages in the region, unsuccessfully tried to capture the castle in Chernokozinets after which he turned back, passed Kamieniec Podolski, reached Zinkov on the Ushitsa River, captured and burned the town. The Moldavians also burned Satans on the Zbruch River. At the time, the army of the Polish defense was in the royal towns in the southern Ruthenian lands. After the news of the Moldavian invasion, around 6,000 troops that included 17 banners of defense cavalry (about 1,800 horsemen) were assembled near Trembowla. The Polish army was not fully prepared for winter fighting; among other things, Polish horses were not shod, and hostilities were conducted in heavy icy conditions. Reconnaissance was also poor. The army was commanded by the crown field guard Mikołaj Sieniawski and Andrzej Tęczyński. Despite the huge advantage of the enemy, it was decided to fight a battle. It was decided to confront the Moldavian army while crossing the Seret River, in a bend of that river south of Trembowla, in the vicinity of the villages of Dolina and Kobyloche. Rares's army prepared for battle on a hill on the left bank of the river. The Polish banners, divided into two columns, spread out close to the Seret, on its steep bank. The right wing was commanded by Sieniawski, while the left wing was commanded by Tęczynski, who, even though not all the banners had arrived on the scene, decided to fight: for they were no longer willing to give way, and the second rota behind them drew slowly.

The course of the battle itself is not precisely known. It is likely that there was a flanking of the Polish troops. After heavy shelling from bows and an attack by Moldavian cavalry, the Polish cavalry was pushed over the steep cliff of the Seret. The Poles found themselves in a swamp, some of the horsemen fell into the ravine, and those who managed to descend crossed the frozen Seret. The defeat was complete, with the deaths of Rittmasters Pilecki and Weglinski, 60 comrades and more than 800 postmen, for a total of about 900 combatants. Many soldiers were taken prisoner, including Rittmaster Maciej Wlodek. Tęczyński with some of the surviving soldiers retreated to the castle in Trembowla. Certainly, a major command mistake was the decision to fight such a numerous opponent, in an inconvenient place, in heavily undulating terrain, steep and icy in places, in which the light Moldavian cavalry outnumbered the Polish cavalry, which had heavier armaments, and which moreover rode unshod horses.

== End of the war ==
Moldavian losses must also have been heavy, as Rares stopped further looting of the Polish borderlands and retreated beyond the Dniester into Moldavia. Petru Rareș defeated a small Polish detachment at Seret, but he was unable to achieve greater success and withdrew to Moldavia which ended the war. Pokuttia remained Polish territory

== See also ==
- Battle of Obertyn
- Moldavian Magnate Wars
- Polish-Ottoman Wars
