= Battle of Seret =

1538 battle between Poland and Moldavia

- Part of the Moldavian–Polish War (1530–1538)
Date	1 February 1538
Location	Seret river, near Trembowla, Poland (present-day Ukraine)
Result	Moldavian victory

Belligerents
Moldavia	Kingdom of Poland

Commanders and leaders
Petru Rareș	Mikołaj Sieniawski; Andrzej Tęczyński; Jan Pilecki †; M. Włodek (POW)

Strength
20,000	6,000

Casualties and losses
Unknown	900 killed Many captured

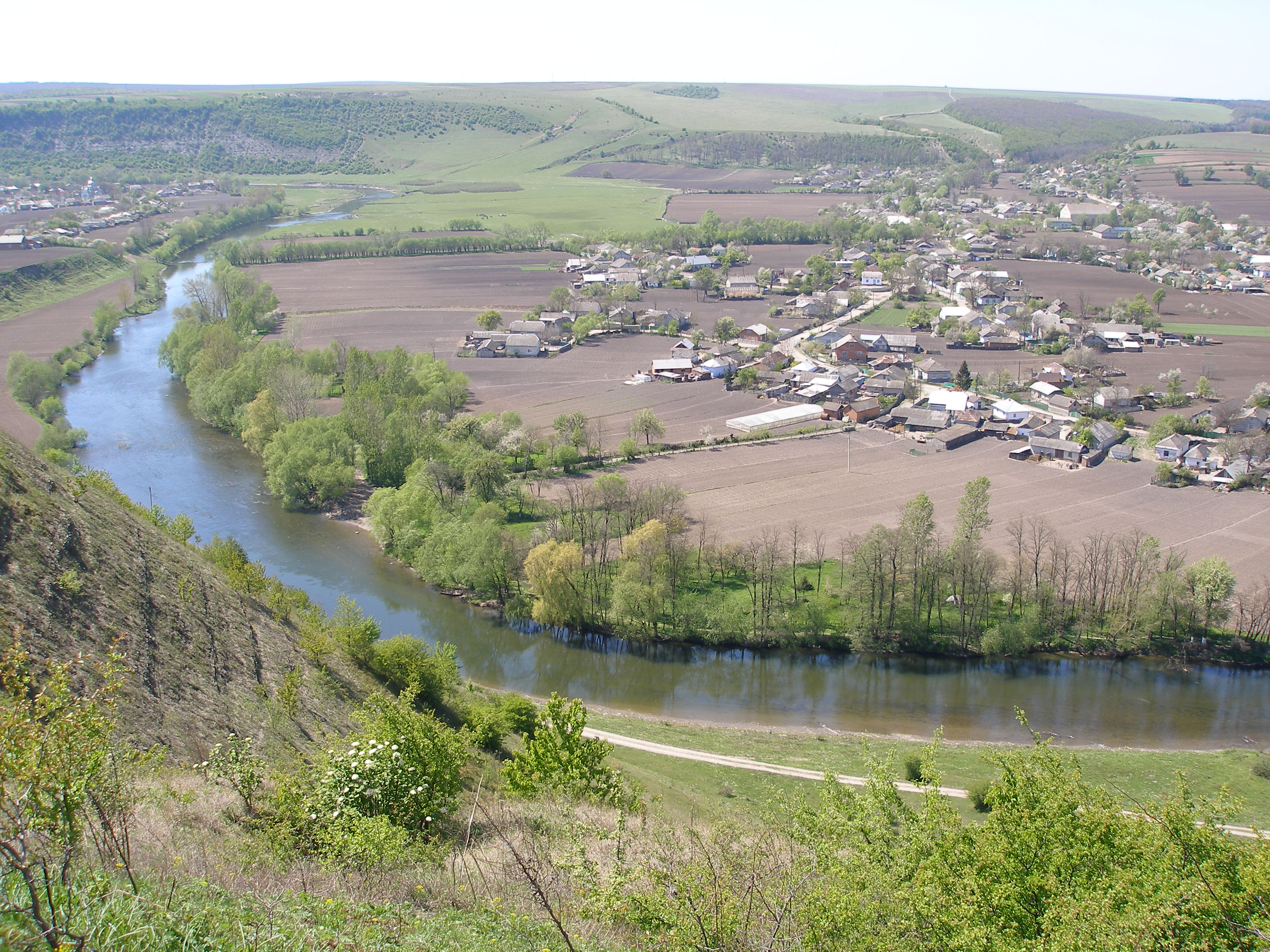
The Seret river, along which the battle was fought

The Battle of Seret took place on 1 February 1538, between the armies of Moldavian voivode Petru Rareș against the Polish commanders Mikołaj Sieniawski and Andrzej Tęczyński, which resulted in Moldavian victory, marking the last military confrontation of the Moldavian–Polish War in 1538.

== Prelude ==
After a heavy defeat inflicted by Poles on Moldavians at the Battle of Obertyn on 22 August 1531, Moldavian voivode Petru Rareș signed a peace treaty with the Polish King Sigismund I on 20 February 1532, temporarily ceasing hostility between Poland and Moldavia. Jan Amor Tarnowski was considered to be a hero in Poland for stopping Moldavians at Obertyn. However, the conflict would end up renewing in 1538, as Petru Rareș assembled a new army and intended to occupy Polish-controlled Pokuttia, following the provocations of Mikołaj Sieniawski on the Moldavian border in 1537.

== Battle ==
In January 1538, Petru Rareș's Moldavian army invaded the south-eastern lands of the Kingdom of Poland. He looted settlements and castles such as Jagielnica, Satanów, Czerwone and Zinkowie.

Moldavian voivode Petru Rareș led a 20,000-strong army, while Polish commanders Mikołaj Sieniawski and Andrzej Tęczyński assembled a winter defense army of 6,000 troops, including 17 cavalry banners (1,800 horsemen), which were supposed to take on the main fighting on 1 February. The Polish army was divided into two groups on a steep bank, near Seret, with left wing led by Andrzej Tęczyński and right by Mikołaj Sieniawski. However, the Polish forces were in an unfavorable position, as they fought during winter on a frozen banks of Seret river and were outnumbered by Moldavians. The course of the battle isn't known, but the Moldavians likely outflanked the Poles, used heavy bow fire against the Polish troops, with Polish cavalry stuck in the mud or falling into ravine, forcing the rest of the army to flee and survivors to descend cross the frozen Seret river.

== Aftermath ==
The battle resulted in Moldavian victory and was considered to be the biggest Polish defeat in a border conflict for its time. The Polish army suffered 900 killed and many captured, including 800 pocztowy and 80 towarzysze falling in battle, alongside captains Jan Pilecki killed and Maciej Włodek captured. Polish chronicler Marcin Bielski blamed the defeat on the poor leadership of Mikołaj Sieniawski and Andrzej Tęczyński, which chose to fight a numerically superior enemy in an unfavorable environment.

Despite the Moldavian tactical success, Petru Rareș decided to renounce his claims to Pokuttia and end the war with Poland, as he was threatened by the Ottoman Empire from the south and didn't want to fight a two front war against both the Kingdom of Poland and the Ottoman Empire.
