= Adam Hieronim Sieniawski =

Adam Hieronim Sieniawski was the name of two Polish–Lithuanian nobles:

- Adam Hieronim Sieniawski (1576–1616), starost of Jaworów
- Adam Hieronim Sieniawski (1623/1624–1650), starost of Lwów
