= Sieniawski (Leliwa) =

Polish szlachta family

Leliwa coat of arms

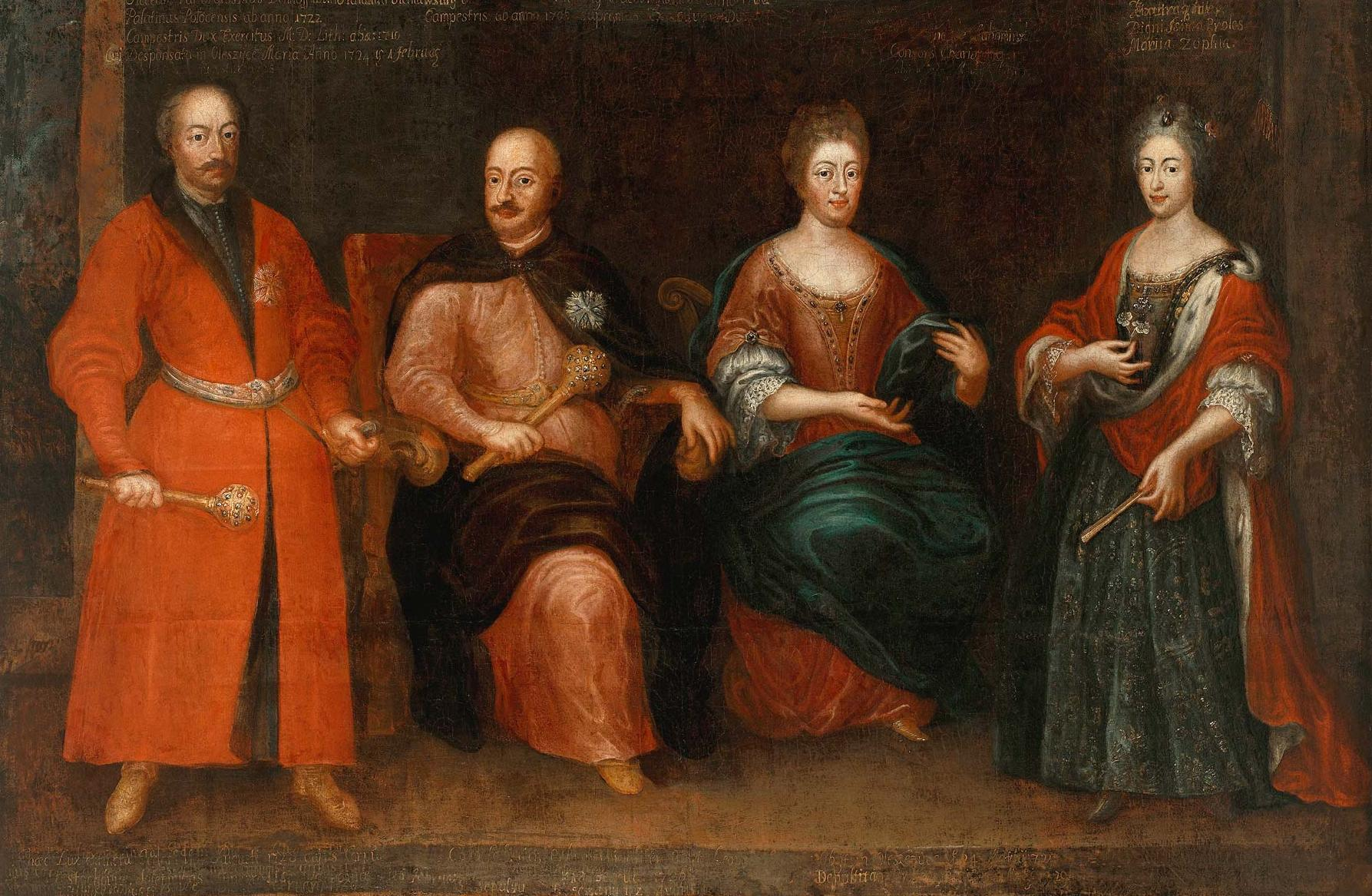
Sieniawski family portrait

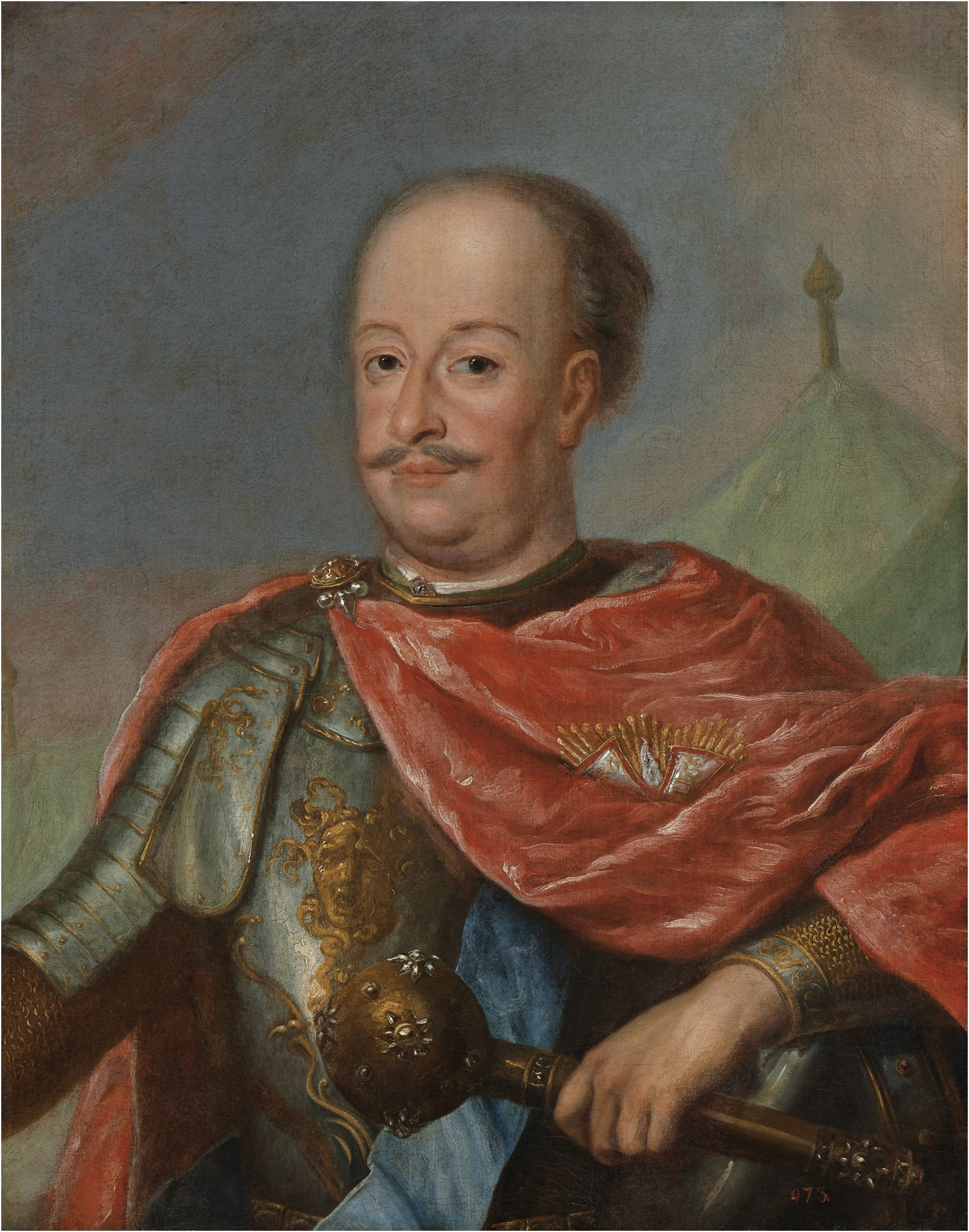
Adam Sieniawski

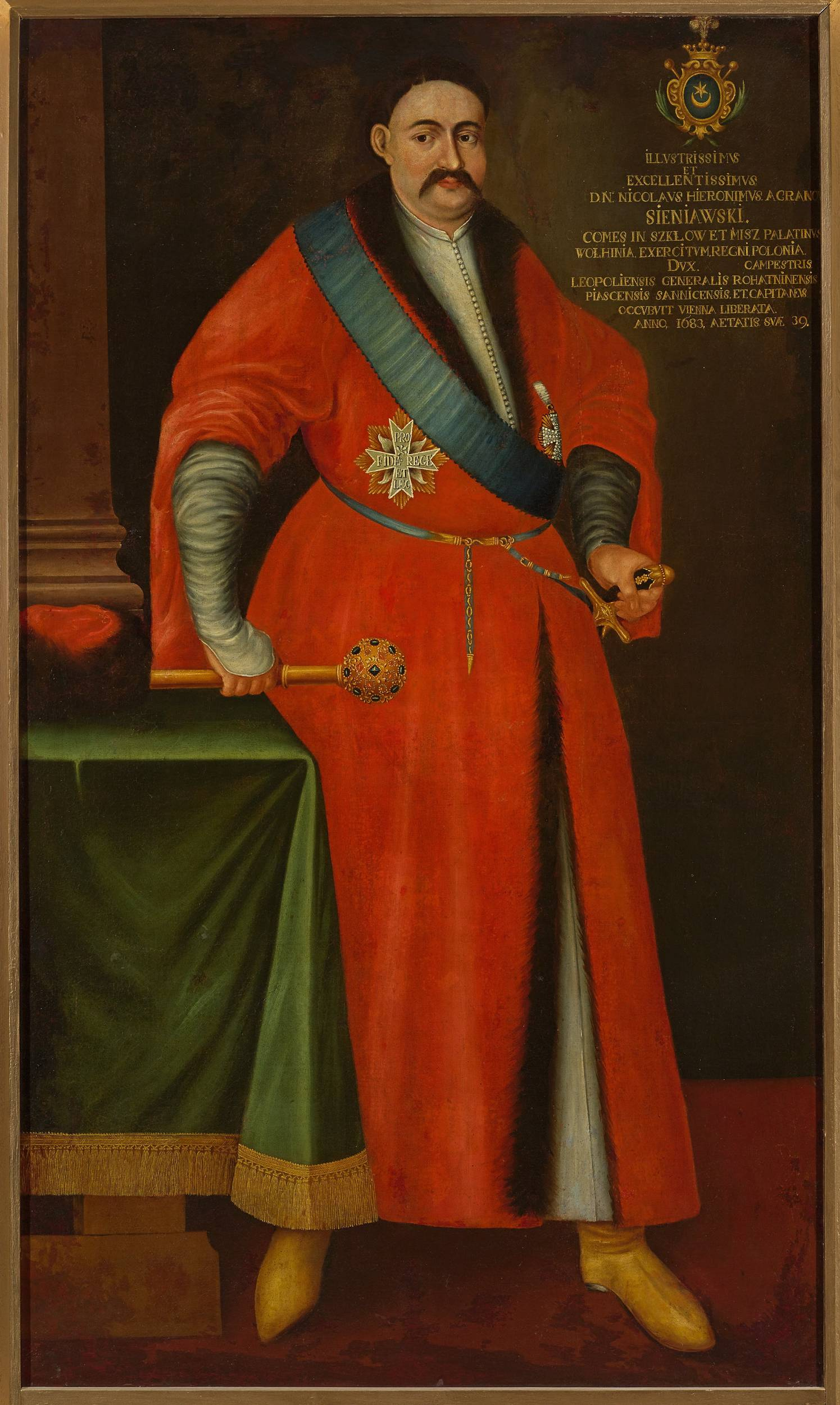
Mikołaj Hieronim Sieniawski

The Sieniawski family (plural: Sieniawscy, feminine form: Sieniawska) was a prominent and powerful Polish noble family. They were magnates in the First Republic of Poland. Their properties were inherited by the Czartoryski family after the family expired in the 18th century.

== Coat of arms ==
The Sieniawski family used the Leliwa coat of arms.

Coat of Arms of Prokop Sieniawski (A mix with Chodkiewicz coat of arms. Prokops wife was a member of the Chodkiewicz family.)

== Notable members ==
- Świętosław Sieniawski
  - Gunter Sieniawski (died c. 1494), Judge of Lwów
    - Rafał Sieniawski (died 1518), Chorąży of the Crown, married Agnieszka Cebrowska z Cebra h. Hołobok
      - Mikołaj Sieniawski (1489–1569), Great Hetman of the Crown, married Katarzyna Koła h. Junosza
          - Hieronim Jarosz Sieniawski (c. 1516 – 1587), voivode of the Ruthenian Voivodship, married firstly Elżbieta Radziwiłł h. Trąby, secondly Hanna Zasławska h. Pogoń Litewska, thirdly Anna Maciejowska h. Ciołek, fourthly Jadwiga Tarło h. Topór
            - Adam Hieronim Sieniawski (1576–1619), podczaszy of the Crown, married Katarzyna Kostka h. Dąbrowa
                - Mikołaj Sieniawski (died 1636), podczaszy of the Crown, deputy of the Sejm, married Urszula Zofia Krotska h. Leszczyc
                - Prokop Sieniawski (1602–1626), Court chorąży of the Crown, married Anna Eufrozyna Chodkiewicz h. Kościesza
                    - Adam Hieronim Sieniawski (1623–1650, ) starost of Lwów and Crown Field Clerk, married Wiktoria Elżbieta Potocka h. Piława
                        - Mikołaj Hieronim Sieniawski (1645–1683), Field Hetman of the Crown, married Cecylia Maria Radziwiłł h. Trąby
                            - Adam Mikołaj Sieniawski (1666–1726), Great Hetman of the Crown, married Elżbieta Helena Sieniawska (1669–1729)
                              - Maria Zofia Sieniawska (1699–1777), last member of the Sieniawski family. Wife of Stanisław Ernest Denhoff, and since 1731 married to August Aleksander Czartoryski
            - Mikołaj Sieniawski (c. 1520 – 1584), Field Hetman of the Crown, married Hanna Sapieha h. Lis
            - Rafał Sieniawski (died 1592), castellan of Kamieniec Podolski, married firstly Katarzyna Dziaduska h. Jelita and secondly Zofia Chodkiewicz h. Kościesza
            - Aleksander Sieniawski (c. 1490 – 1568), stolnik of Lwów, Field Watchman of the Crown
            - Prokop Sieniawski (died 1566), stolnik of Lwów, married Anna Lwowska h. Nałęcz
              - Prokop Sieniawski (died 1596), Court Marshal of the Crown, married Elżbieta Gostomska h. Nałęcz
                  - Zofia Sieniawska (1591–1629), Benedictine abbess in Sandomierz

== Palaces ==
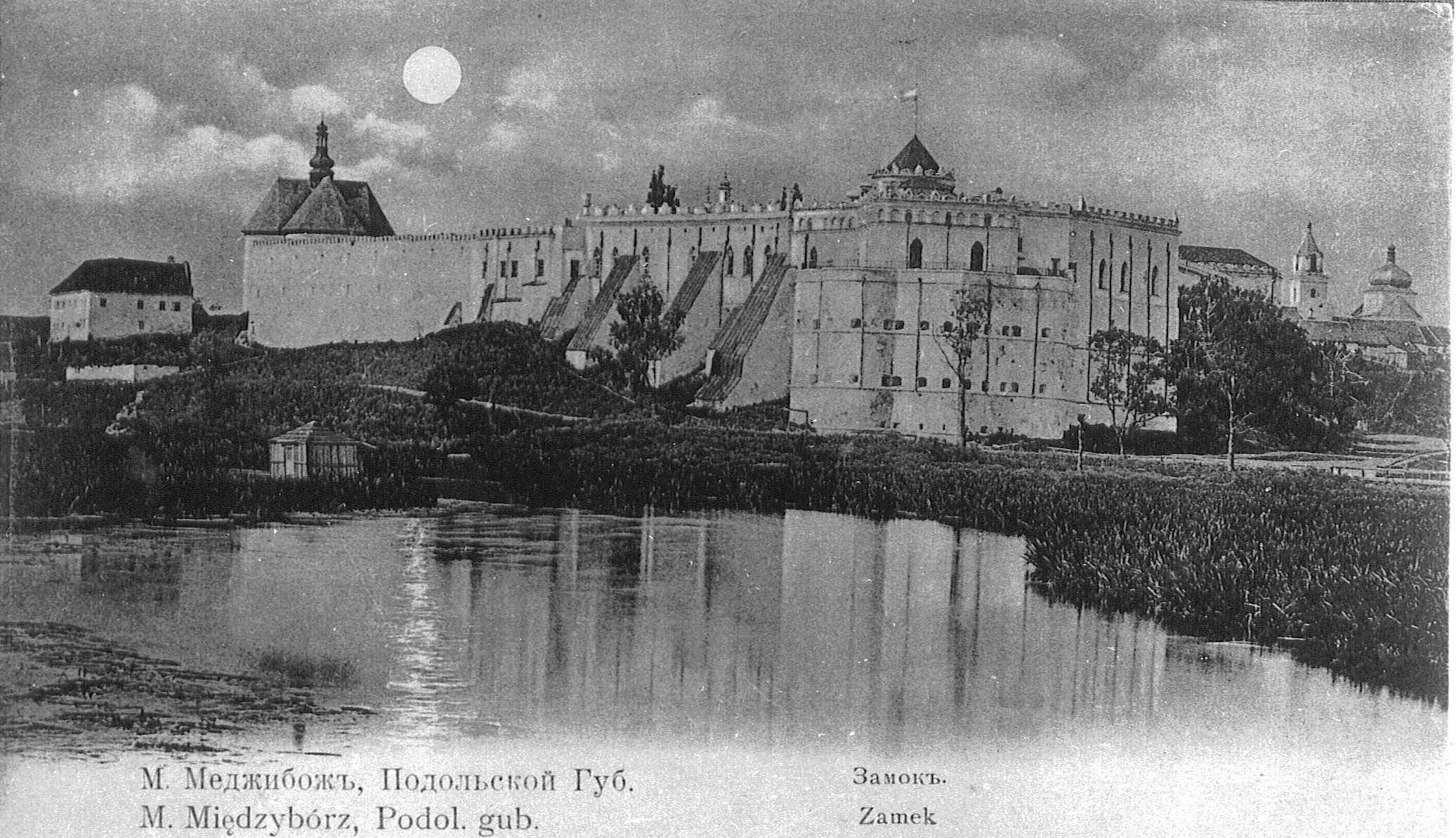
Międzyburz Castle – built by Mikołaj Sieniawski

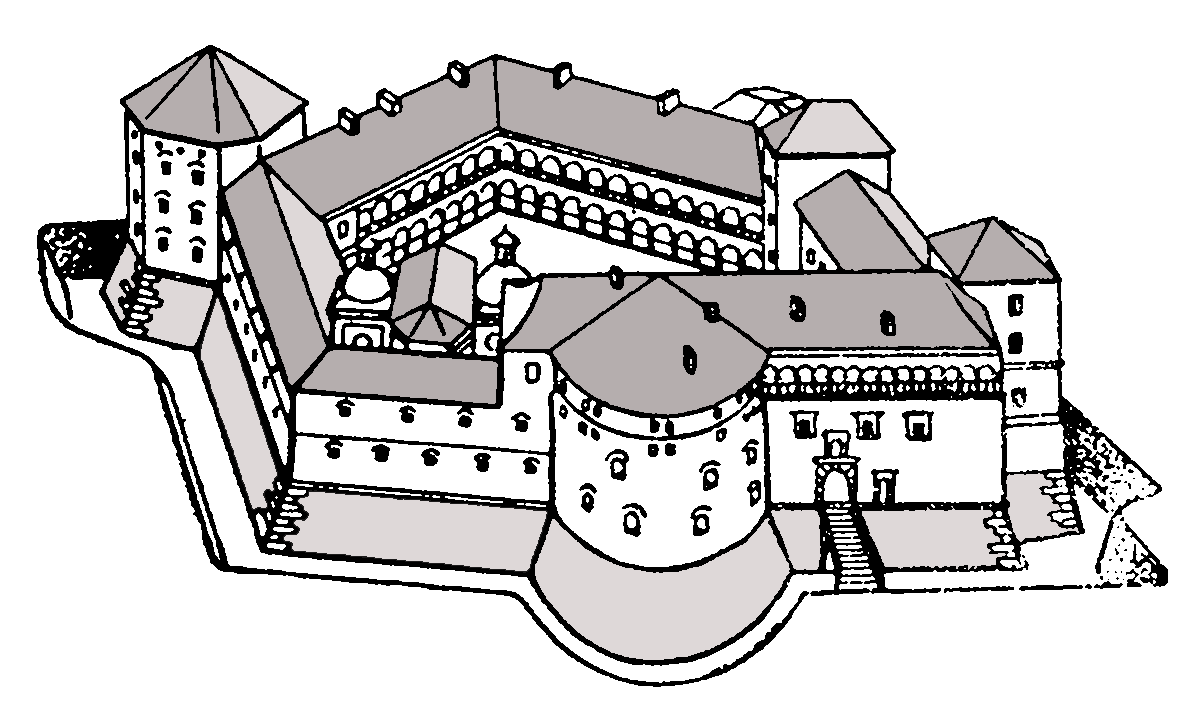
Reconstruction of the Berezhany fortress – built by Mikołaj Sieniawski

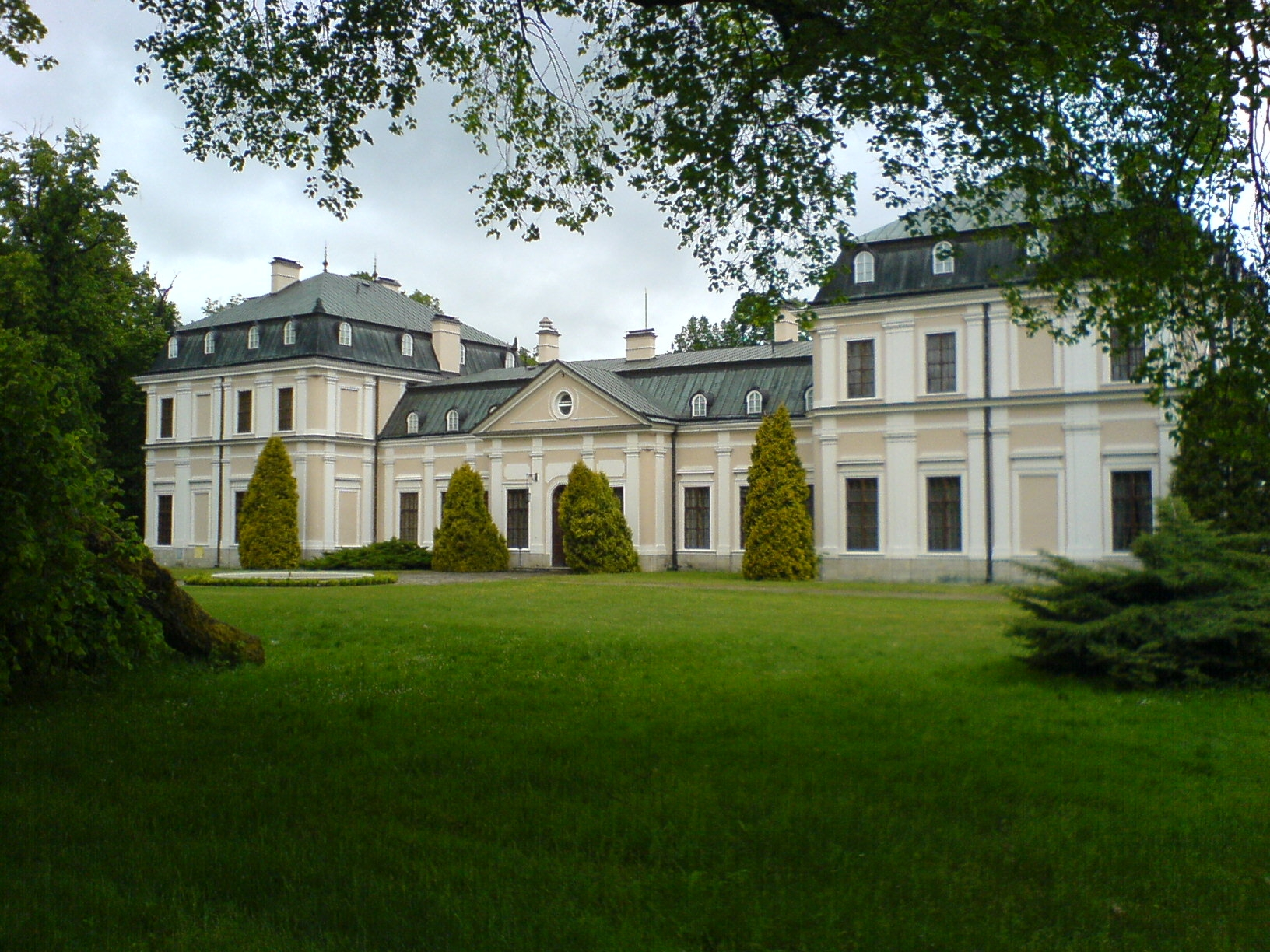
Sieniawski Palace in Sieniawa – built by Adam Mikołaj Sieniawski

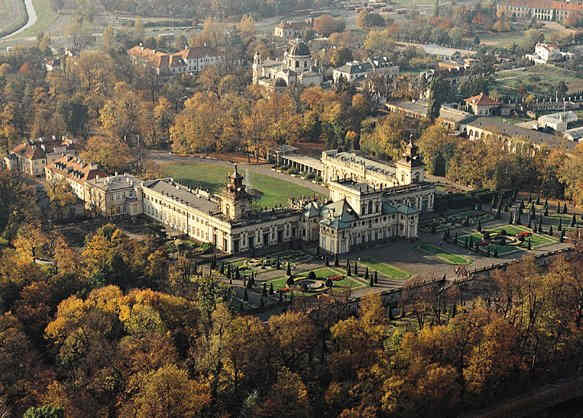
Palace in Wilanów

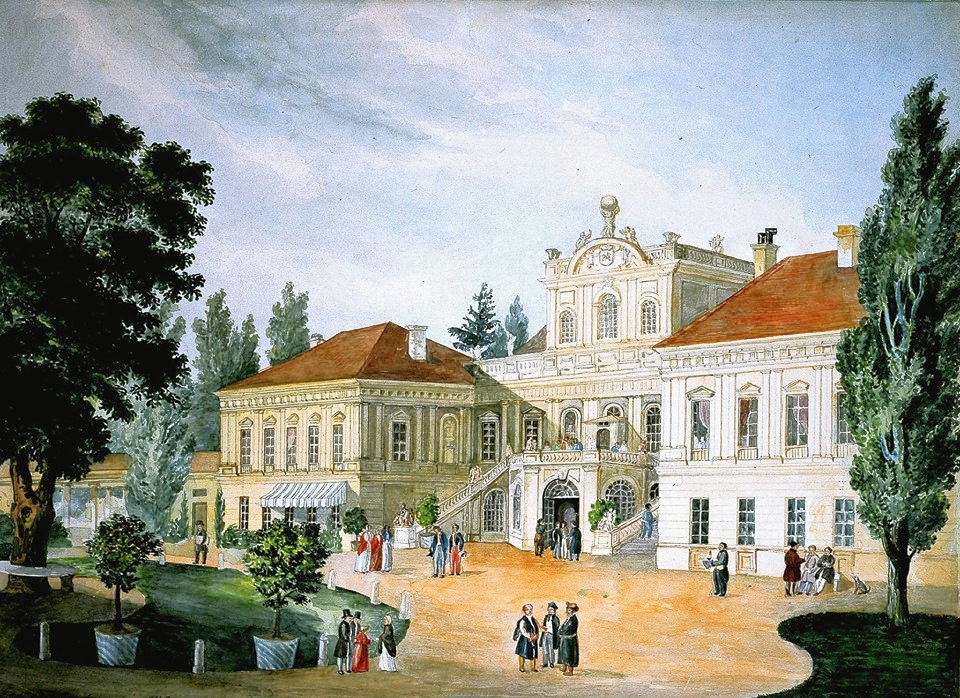
Czartoryski Palace in Puławy

== Bibliography ==
- K. Kuśmierz, Sieniawa. Założenia Rezydencjonalne Sieniawskich, Kraków, 1984 r.
