= Berezhany Castle =

Castle in Berezhany, Ukraine

Coordinates: 49°26′46.49″N 24°56′41.86″E

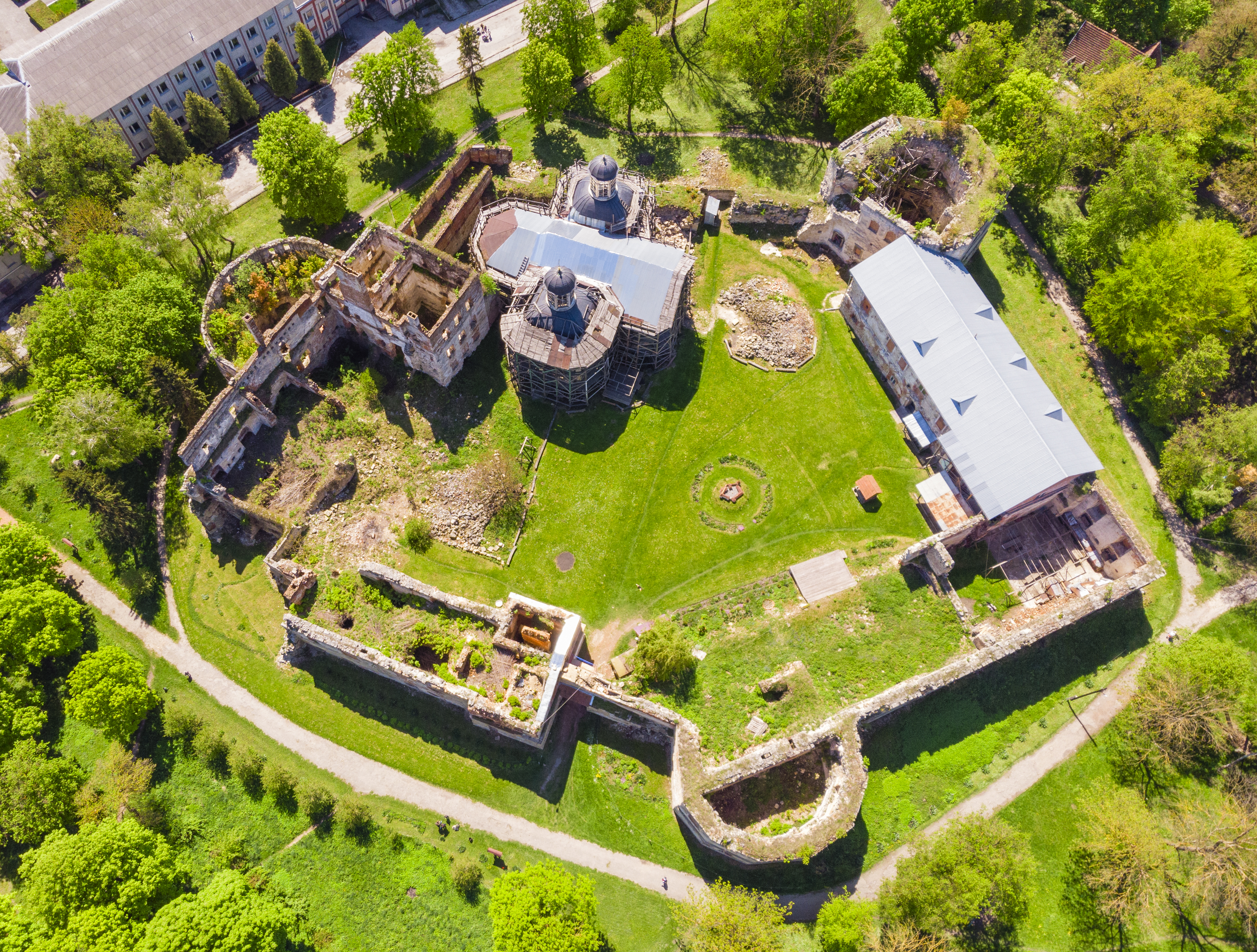
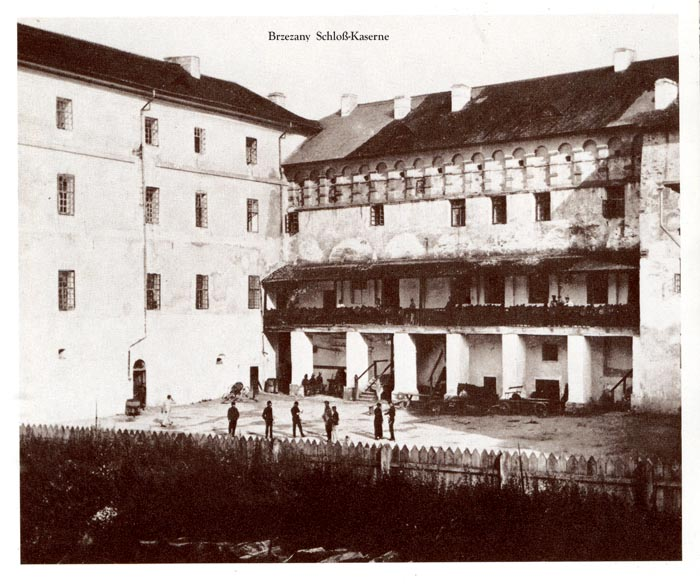
On the left: Under the walls of Berezhany Castle. On the right: the infantry barracks of the Austrian imperial army in 1900.

Berezhany Castle (Ukrainian: Бережанський замок, romanized: Berezhans'kyi zamok, Polish: Zamek w Brzeżanach), around which the modern town of Berezhany has sprung up, was built on an island in the Zolota Lypa River in the 1530s and 1540s by Mikołaj Sieniawski as the main residence of the Sieniawski magnate family.

Mikołaj Sieniawski turned the adjoining church of the Holy Trinity into a family mausoleum and a private church. Currently decayed, the church was a prominent example of early Baroque style.

In 1630, the castle's fortifications were expanded. It was so well fortified that neither Khmelnitsky's Cossacks (in 1648 and 1648) nor the Turks (in 1675) succeeded in taking it. In 1655, it was surrendered to the Swedes without a fight. The local Jewish community was made responsible for the upkeep and maintenance of the walls in 1667.

After Maria Zofia Sieniawska's marriage to August Aleksander Czartoryski, the castle passed to the Czartoryski family (1726), then to the Princes Lubomirski (1778) and to the Counts Potocki (1816). Those new owners allowed it to fall into such disrepair that in 1908 visitors were cautioned not to enter the castle for fear of being smashed by falling masonry.

The castle was further damaged during the First World War, as was the late Gothic church from 1554 which contains a number of elaborate tombs of the Sieniawskis. The Brzeżany tombs were executed by Jan Pfister and other leading Polish artists of the 16th and 17th centuries.

The castle complex is an architectural monument of national significance and protected under the number 190007.

== Sources ==
- Szulakowska, Urszula (2018). Renaissance and Baroque Art and Culture in the Eastern Polish-Lithuanian Commonwealth (1506-1696). Cambridge Scholar Publishing. p. 183. ISBN 978-1-5275-1135-4.
- Памятники градостроительства и архитектуры Украинской ССР, 4 volumes, Kiev: Будивэльнык, 1983-86, the article on Бережанский замок (online)
