= Hieronim Jarosz Sieniawski =

Polish noble (c. 1516 – 1579)

- Coat of arms: Leliwa
- Born: c. 1516
- Died: 1579
- Family: Sieniawski
- Consort: Elżbieta Radziwiłł; Hanna Zasławska; Anna Maciejowska; Jadwiga Tarło
- Issue: with Jadwiga Tarło; Adam Hieronim Sieniawski
- Father: Mikołaj Sieniawski
- Mother: Katarzyna Kola

Hieronim Jarosz Sieniawski (c. 1516 – 1579) was a Polish noble.

He was a starost of Halicz and Kołomyja since 1550, Podkomorzy of Kamieniec Litewski since 1554, castellan of Kamieniec Litewski since 1569 and voivode of the Ruthenian Voivodeship since 1576.

He was married four times: to Elżbieta Radziwiłł from about 1559; to Hanna Zasławska from 1565 to 1568; to Anna Maciejowska (no exact dates); and to Jadwiga Tarło from 1574 or 1575.
