= Adam Mikołaj Sieniawski =

Polish nobleman (1666–1726)

- Grand Hetman of the Crown
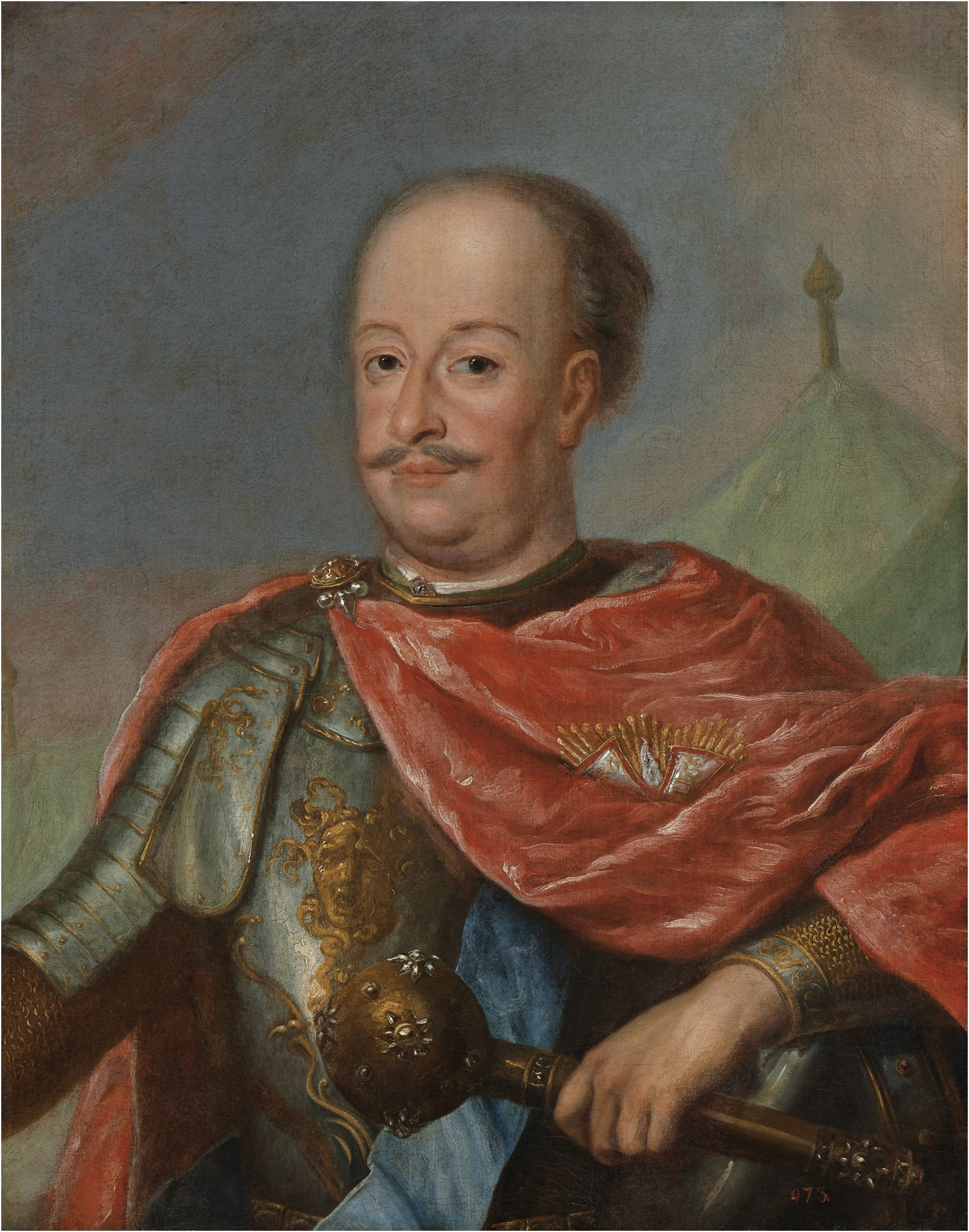
- Coat of arms: Leliwa
- Born: 1666; Lwów, Polish–Lithuanian Commonwealth
- Died: 18 February 1726 (aged 59–60); Lwów, Polish–Lithuanian Commonwealth
- Noble family: Sieniawski family
- Spouse: Elżbieta Lubomirska
- Issue: Maria Zofia Czartoryska
- Father: Mikołaj Hieronim Sieniawski
- Mother: Cecylia Maria Radziwiłł

Adam Mikołaj Sieniawski (1666–1726) was a Polish nobleman, aristocrat and military leader.

He was the son of Hetman Mikołaj Hieronim Sieniawski and Cecylia Maria Radziwiłł, daughter of Court and Grand Marshal Prince Aleksander Ludwik Radziwiłł. He married Elżbieta Lubomirska, daughter of Court and Grand Marshal Prince Stanisław Herakliusz Lubomirski, in 1687.

Sieniawski was voivode (governor) of Bełz Voivodeship from 1692 to 1710, Field Crown Hetman since 1702, Great Crown Hetman since 1706, Castellan of Kraków since 1710 as well as starost of Lviv, Rohatyn, Lubaczów, Stryj and Piaseczno.

In 1697 he supported François Louis, Prince of Conti as candidate for king of Poland but accepted the election of Augustus II. As commander of the Sandomierz Confederation, he thwarted the attempt to unite forces of Stanisław Leszczyński with them of Charles XII of Sweden. Later, in opposition to King Augustus II.

Like his father he participated in the Vienna expedition of 1683. He commanded the left wing of Polish forces at the Battle of Vienna.
