= Battle of Obertyn =

1531 battle in Europe

- Part of Moldavian–Polish War (1530–1538)
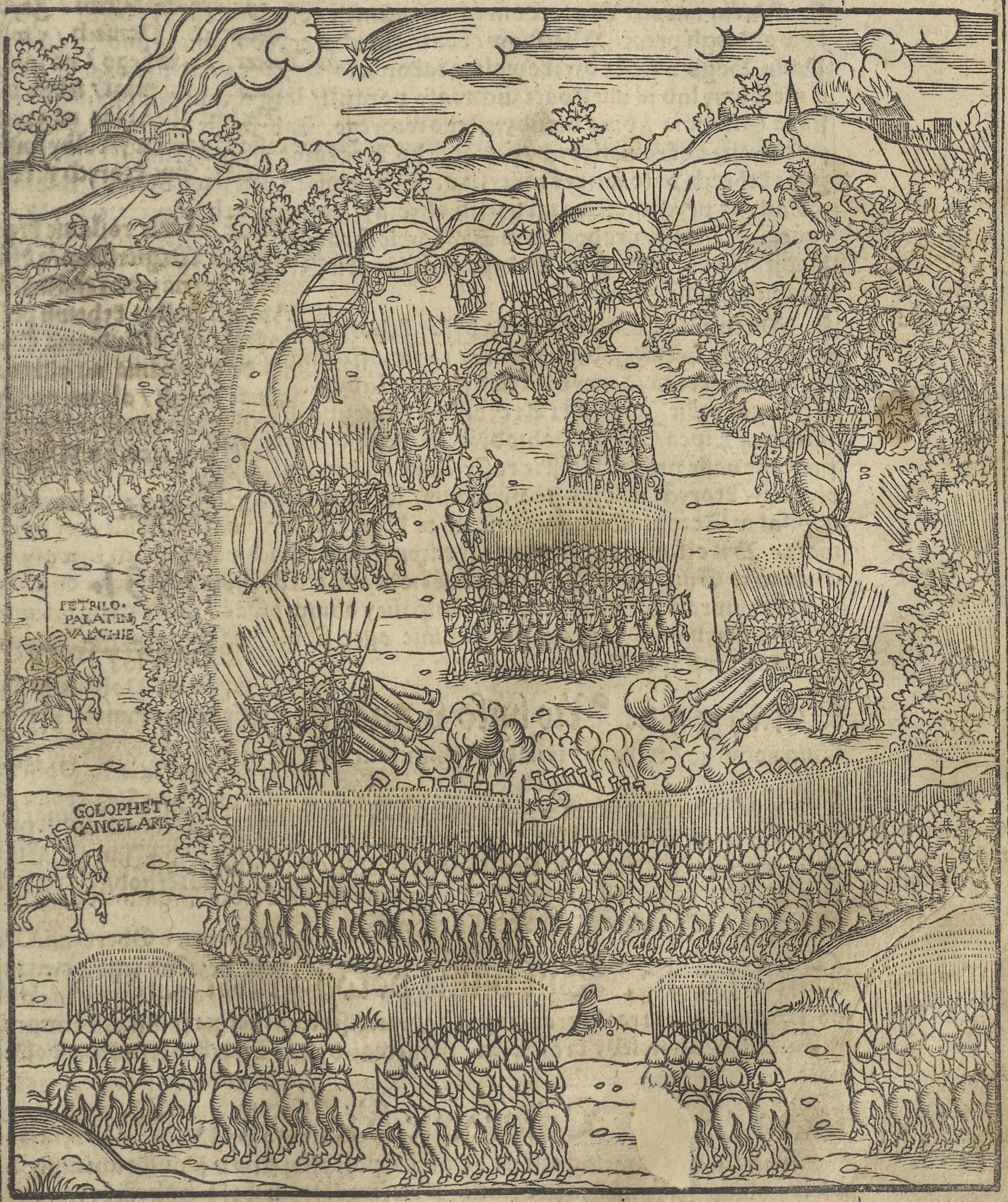
- Moldavian Army engaging the Poles
Date	August 22, 1531
Location	Obertyn in Pokutia, Ukraine
Result	Polish victory

Belligerents
Kingdom of Poland	Moldavia

Commanders and leaders
Jan Amor Tarnowski	Petru Rareş

Strength
4,484 cavalry 1,167 infantry 1,143 firearms 12 cannons	17,000 cavalry 50 cannons

Casualties and losses
256 killed	7,746 killed 1,000 captured 50 cannons lost

The Battle of Obertyn (August 22, 1531) was fought between Moldavian Voivode Petru Rareş and Polish forces under hetman Jan Tarnowski, in the town of Obertyn, south of the Dniester River, now in Ukraine. The battle ended with a Polish victory and the reconquest of Pokutia.

== Background ==
In 1490, Stephen III of Moldavia conquered Pokutia, detaching it from the Polish kingdom. He tried to have the land recognized as his and was supported by the Kingdom of Hungary. After Stephen's death (1504), the land was retaken by the Poles. Between 1529 and 1530, the Moldavians campaigned in Pokutia. Since Moldavia was a vassal state to the Porte, King Sigismund I the Old sent a letter to Sultan Suleiman the Magnificent to ask him where he stood on the conflict. The Sultan replied that the Poles were allowed to battle in the disputed Pokutia, but were not permitted to set foot on Moldavian soil, as that would be seen as a declaration of war on the Ottomans. This restriction was disadvantageous to the Poles, mainly because of the greater mobility of the Moldavian troops.

== The battle ==
=== Preparations ===
The Poles were led by the Crown Hetman of Hired Soldiers, Jan Tarnowski, to lead the army, as the Polish parliament voted to raise taxes on their serfs in order to recruit mercenary soldiers. Tarnowski was given 4,800 cavalry, 1,200 infantry, 12 cannon, and a Tabor wagon train of unknown size. He picked the town of Obertyn, north of the Dniester River, as his operation point.

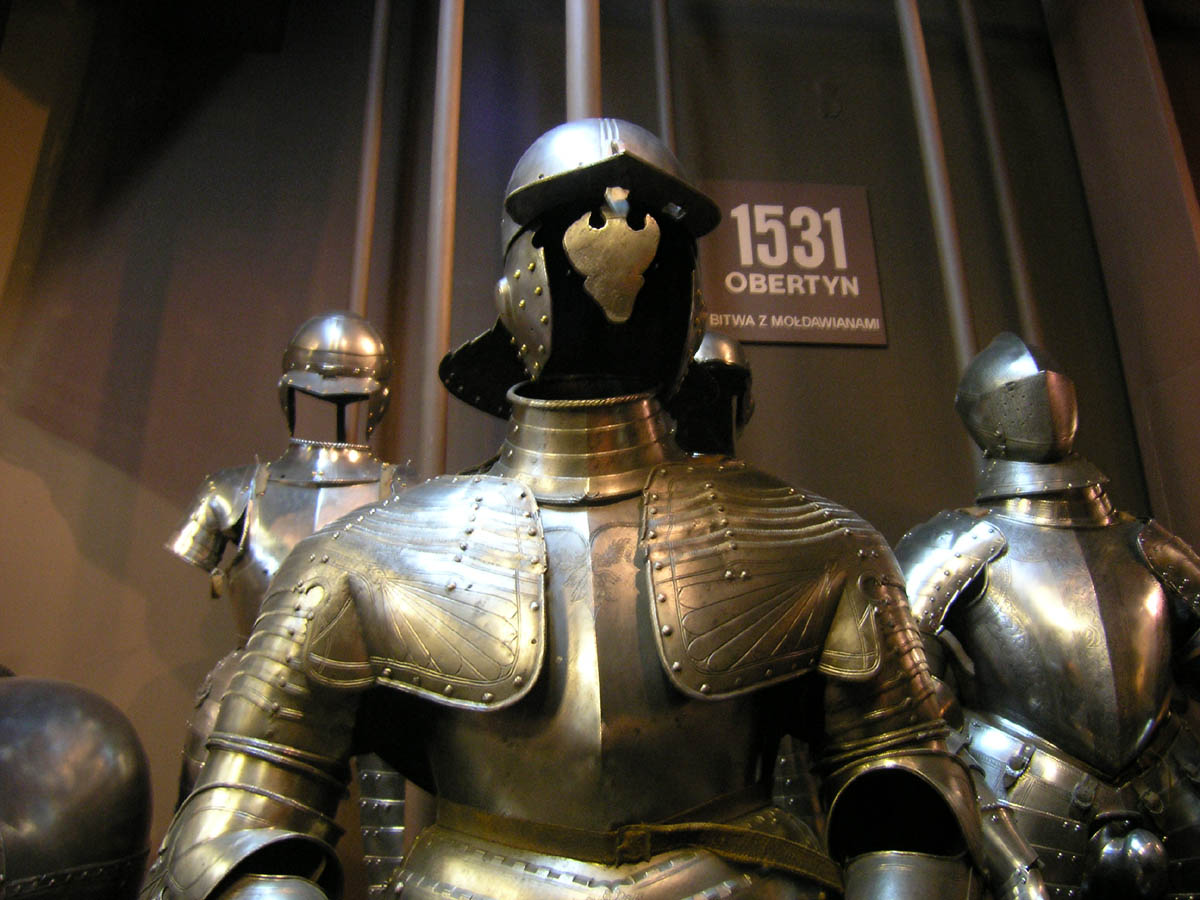
Polish armour from the battle of Obertyn

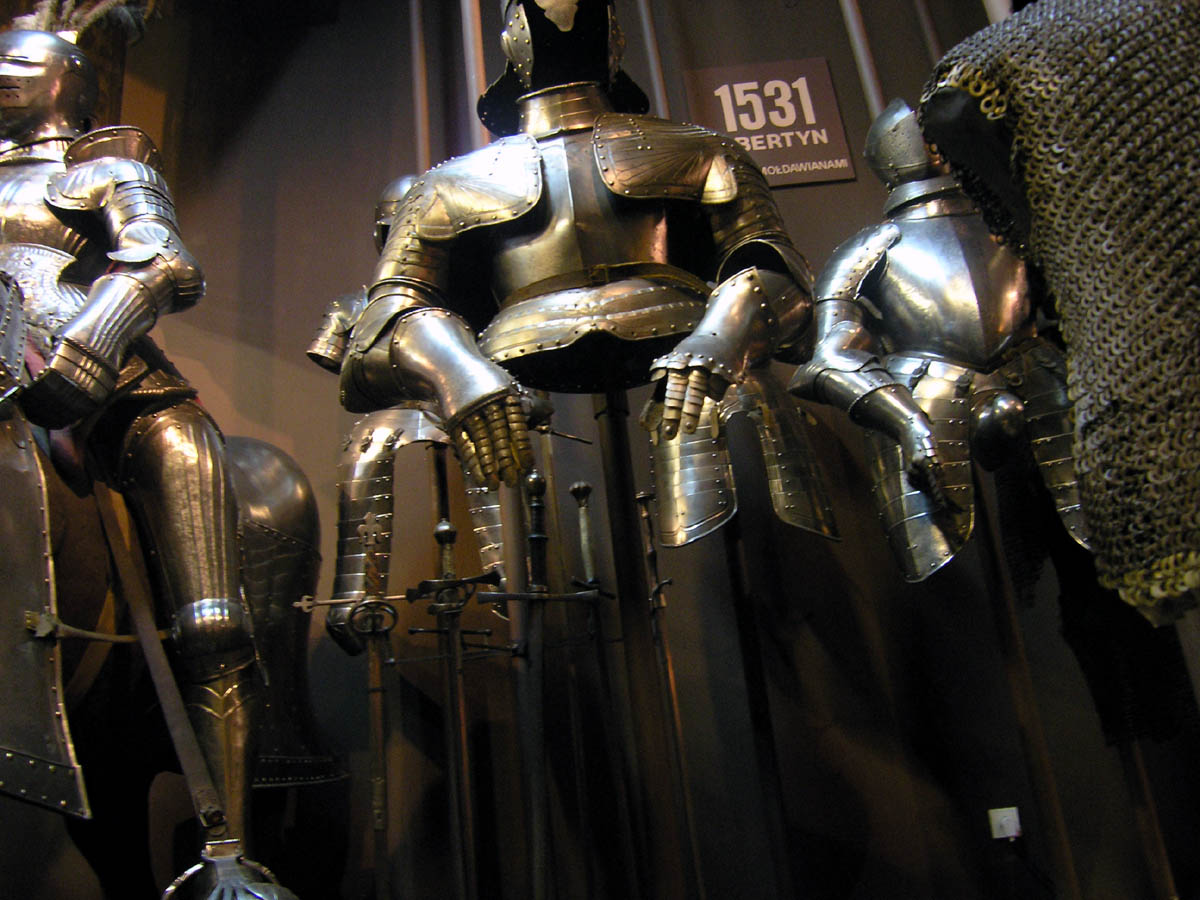
Image showing that it's three-quarter armour

Between June 3 and 5, Tarnowski sent 1,000 cavalry to oust the Moldavians from the region, and then quickly moved back to Obertyn. He then placed 100 infantry to defend the town of Gwoździec (modern Hvizdets), a few kilometers south of Obertyn. Between June 6 and July 18, Rareş responded by sending out a force of 6,000 cavalry to besiege Gwoździec. The Polish main army moved from Obertyn to Gwoździec and engaged the Moldavians, whom they routed. From July 18 to 21, the Moldavians advanced with 18,000 cavalry, 50 cannon, and some infantry against the 6,000-strong Polish army that had recently regrouped. Tarnowski left some of his infantry in Gwoździec and made a slow retreat to defensive position defended by forest, north of Obertyn, where he fortified his army with his Tabor wagons. The artillery was placed in three corners of the camp and a part of the infantry was placed in the wagons, while the rest of his force, most of it cavalry, was deployed in the interior of the camp.

On July 22, the Moldavians sent light cavalry to attack the Polish wagon-fort, but these were repelled by the Polish infantry. The Moldavian cannon opened fire on the wagon-fort, but with little effect. Meanwhile, the far better trained and equipped Polish artillery inflicted severe damage on the Moldavian cannon. One-third of the Polish cavalry then launched several successful attacks on the Moldavian left, forcing Rareş to reinforce it. He, however, left some infantry to defend his right and secure the route to Obertyn, in case he needed to retreat. The remaining Polish cavalry attacked the Moldavian right and routed it, but suffered casualties from the Moldavian artillery. A final Polish attack routed the entire Moldavian army. The Moldavians lost around 7,000 cavalry, 1,000 that were taken prisoners, and all the cannons, while the Poles lost only 256 men.

== Aftermath ==
The Sultan removed Rareş from his throne with the explanation that "he had disturbed the Porte's best friend, the King of Poland." The Moldavians made another unsuccessful attempt to reconquer Pokutia in 1538.
