= Mikołaj Sieniawski (1520–1584) =

- Field Crown Hetman
- Coat of arms: Leliwa
- Born: 1520
- Died: 1584 (aged 63–64)
- Noble family: Sieniawski
- Father: Mikołaj Sieniawski

Mikołaj Sieniawski (1520–1584) was a Polish magnate, military commander, Field Hetman of the Crown in 1562–64 and 1575–76.
