= Prokop Sieniawski (d. 1627) =

Polish noble (died 1627)

- Prokops personal coat of arms
- Coat of arms: Leliwa
- Died: 9 January 1627; Lwów
- Buried: 16 March 1627; Brzeżany
- Noble family: Sieniawski
- Consort: Anna Eufrozyna Chodkiewicz
- Issue: Adam Hieronim Sieniawski (1623/1624–1650)
- Father: Adam Hieronim Sieniawski
- Mother: Katarzyna Kostka

Prokop Sieniawski (d. 9 January 1627 in Lwów) was a Polish noble.

== Family ==
Prokop was son of Adam Hieronim Sieniawski and Katarzyna Kostka. His younger brother was Mikołaj.

He married Anna Eufrozyna Chodkiewicz in 1623. They had two sons: Aleksander who died shortly after his father in 1627 as a 4-years old child, and Adam Hieronim Sieniawski.

== Career ==
He was Royal Rotmistrz from 1621 onward and Court Chorąży of the Crown after 1622.

According to some older authors, Prokop Sieniawski died in 1626. Stanisław Kurosz in his letter to Krzysztof Radziwiłł from 27 January 1627 stated that Prokop Sieniawski died on 9 January 1627 in Lwów.

Funeral oration of Prokop Sieniawski was told by his friend Jakub Sobieski.

== Bibliography ==
- Nagielski, Mirosław (1996–1997). "Sieniawski Prokop". Polski Słownik Biograficzny. Vol. 37. Polska Akademia Nauk & Polska Akademia Umiejętności.
