= Katarzyna Kostka =

Polish–Lithuanian noblewoman (1576–1648)

- Coat of arms: Dąbrowa
- Born: ca. 1575
- Died: 1648
- Family: Kostka
- Consort: Adam Hieronim Sieniawski
- Issue: Mikołaj Sieniawski; Aleksander Sieniawski; Prokop Sieniawski
- Father: Jan Kostka
- Mother: Zofia Odrowąż

Katarzyna Kostka (1576–1648) was a Polish–Lithuanian noblewoman.

The daughter of Jan Kostka, she married Adam Hieronim Sieniawski around 1598.
