= Gwoździec, Podkarpackie Voivodeship =

Gwoździec
- Village
- Location within Poland
- Coordinates: 50°22′N 22°00′E
- Country: Poland
- Voivodeship: Podkarpackie
- County: Stalowa Wola
- Gmina: Bojanów

Gwoździec [ˈɡvɔʑd͡ʑɛt͡s] is a village in the administrative district of Gmina Bojanów, within Stalowa Wola County, Podkarpackie Voivodeship, in south-eastern Poland.

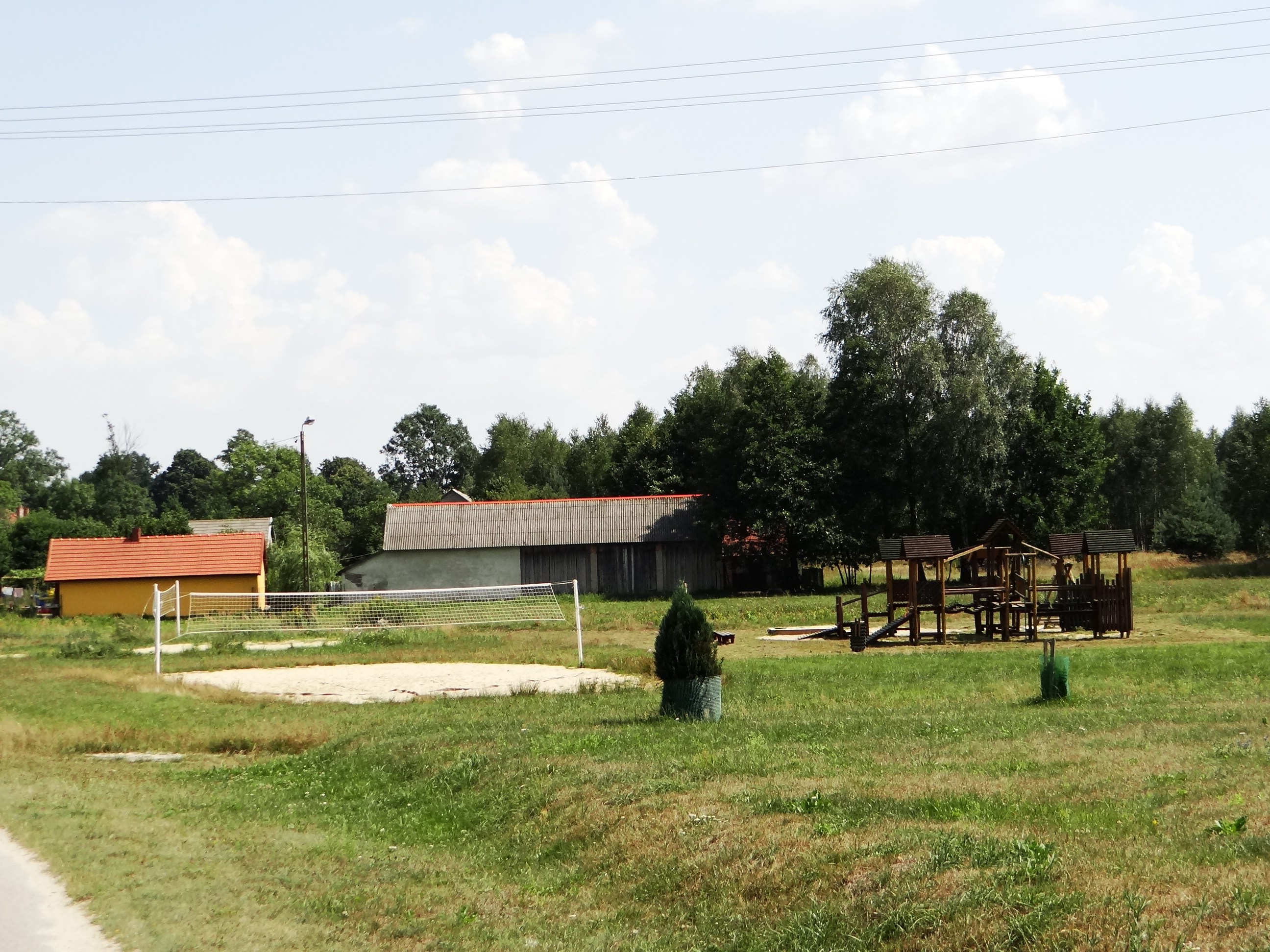
Gwoździec recreation area
