= Adam Hieronim Sieniawski (1623/1624–1650) =

Polish noble (1623/1624–1650)

- Coat of arms: Leliwa
- Born: 1623 or 1624
- Died: January 1650
- Buried: Brzeżany
- Family: Sieniawski
- Wife: Wiktoria Elżbieta Potocka
- Issue: Mikołaj Hieronim Sieniawski
- Father: Prokop Sieniawski
- Mother: Anna Eufrozyna Chodkiewicz

Adam Hieronim Sieniawski (1623 or 1624 – 1650) was a Polish noble

He was the son of Prokop Sieniawski and Eufrozyna née Chodkiewicz.

He was a starost of Lwów since 1648 and Field Clerk of the Crown since 1649.

On 15 February 1643 he was married to Elżbieta (Wiktoria Elżbieta) Potocka, daughter of Stanisław "Rewera" Potocki. Their son was Mikołaj Hieronim Sieniawski.
