= Andrzej Tęczyński =

Polish noble (1480–1536)

Andrzej Tęczyński, (1480 – 2 January 1536) Count (title of the Holy Roman Empire, 1527), was a voivode of Lublin, voivode of Sandomierz, voivode of Kraków, Castellan of Kraków. He came from one of the most powerful clans in Lesser Poland, the Tęczyński family.

== Career ==
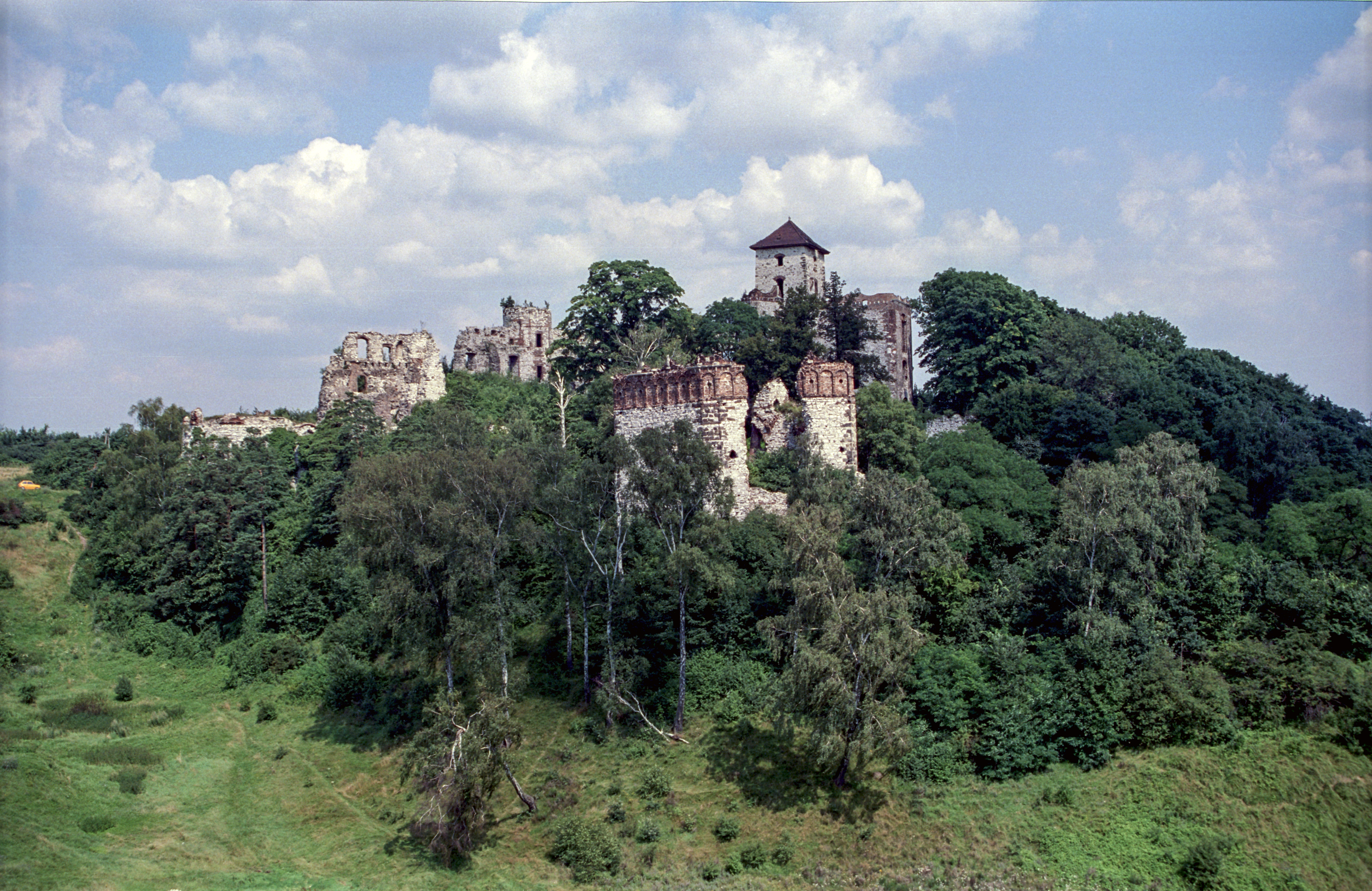
Poland, Jura, Tenczyn Castle.

- 1503 - Royal Courtier
- 1510 - Secretary of the Crown
- 1510 - Chamberlain of Sandomierz
- 1511 - Castellan of Biecki
- 1512 - Referendary of the Crown
- 1515-1519 - Voivode of Lublin
- 1519 - Voivode of Sandomierz
- 1527 - He received from the Emperor Ferdinand I the hereditary title of Count of the Empire for his family. The Habsburgs as the Roman emperors gave some Polish families titles of princes and counts of the Sacri Imperii Romagna for gratitude. Thus, the representatives of these families were called hrabiami Roman Empire.
- 1527 - Voivode of Kraków
- 1532 - Castellan of Kraków

In addition to these titles Andrzej Tęczyński held offices as: starosta of Sandomierz, starosta of Belz, starosta Chełmski, starosta of Terebovlya, starosta of Krasnystaw, starosta of Hrubieszów, starosta of Sokal, starosta of Ratno Dolne, starosta of Tyszowce. He was murdered by an angry mob in the Franciscan church in Kraków on 2 January 1536 for having slapped a knave.

He is one of the characters on the famous painting by Jan Matejko, Prussian Homage.
