= Adam Hieronim Sieniawski (1576–1616) =

Polish–Lithuanian noble

- Famous person
- Coat of arms: Leliwa
- Born: c. 1576
- Died: 4 June 1616
- Family: Sieniawski
- Wife: Katarzyna Kostka
- Issue: Mikolaj Sieniawski; Aleksander Sieniawski; Prokop Sieniawski
- Father: Hieronim Jarosz Sieniawski
- Mother: Jadwiga Tarło

Adam Hieronim Sieniawski (c. 1576 – 1616) was a Polish–Lithuanian noble.

He was a deputy cup-bearer of the Crown since 1661 and starost of Jaworów. Married to Katarzyna Kostka since 1598.

His tin sarcophagus was created by Jan Pfister in Lviv, and is currently in the possession of the Pieskowa Skała.
