= Mikołaj Hieronim Sieniawski =

Polish noble (szlachcic), military leader and politician

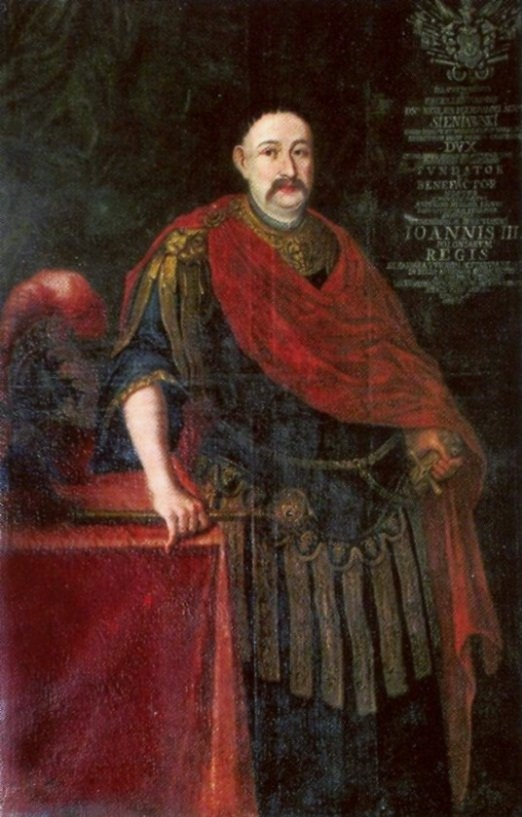
- Born: 1645
- Died: 15 December 1683

Mikołaj Hieronim Sieniawski (1645–1683) was a Polish noble (szlachcic), military leader and politician.

== Early life and family ==
He was the son of the starost of Lwów Adam Hieronim Sieniawski and Wiktoria Elżbieta Potocka, the daughter of Hetman Stanisław "Rewera" Potocki. He married in 1662 the daughter of Court and Grand Marshal Prince Aleksander Ludwik Radziwiłł, Princess Cecylia Maria Radziwiłł.

== Military career and politics ==
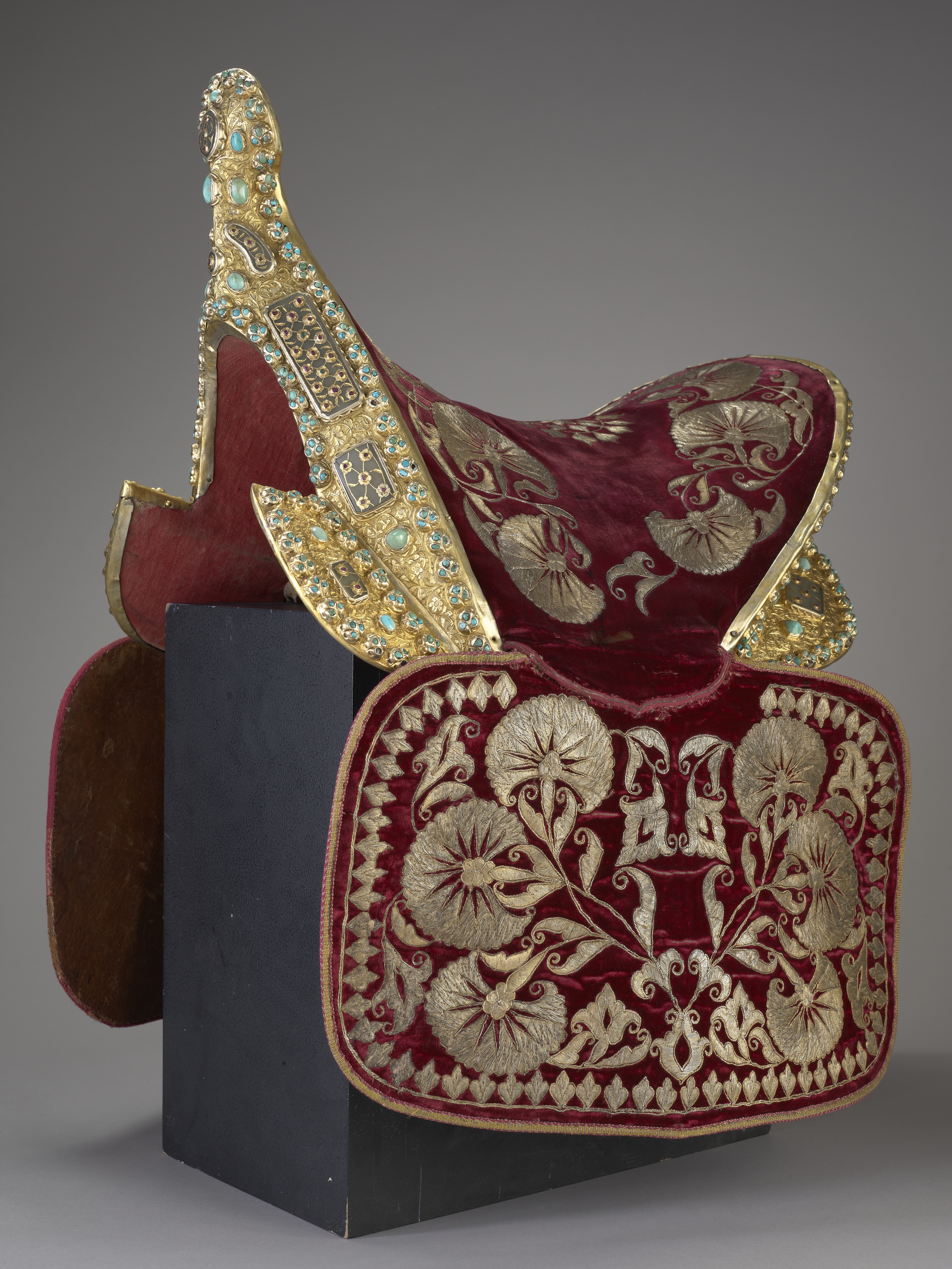
Ottoman saddle with shabrack according to tradition captured at Vienna in 1683 by Mikołaj Hieronim Sieniawski, Czartoryski Museum

He was Grand Guardian of the Crown since 1666, Great Chorąży of the Crown since 1668, Court Marshall of the Crown since 1676, starost of Lwów since 1679, voivode of Volhynian Voivodship since 1679, Field Crown Hetman since the beginning of 1683 and starost of Radom, Rohatyn, and Piaseczno.

He became famous as a talented commander in wars against Cossacks and Tatars during the reign of King John II Casimir. In the rank of a Chorąży, he took part in the Battle of Chocim in 1673, alongside John Sobieski.

He was Marshal of the Coronation Sejm between 2 and 14 March 1676 in Kraków.

Like his son Adam Mikołaj Sieniawski, he participated in the Battle of Vienna in 1683. He fell ill the same year with dysentery and died on his return to Poland on 15 December 1683 in Lubowla, at the age of 38.
