= Jan Tarnowski =

Polish nobleman (1488–1561)

Hetman Jan Amor Tarnowski
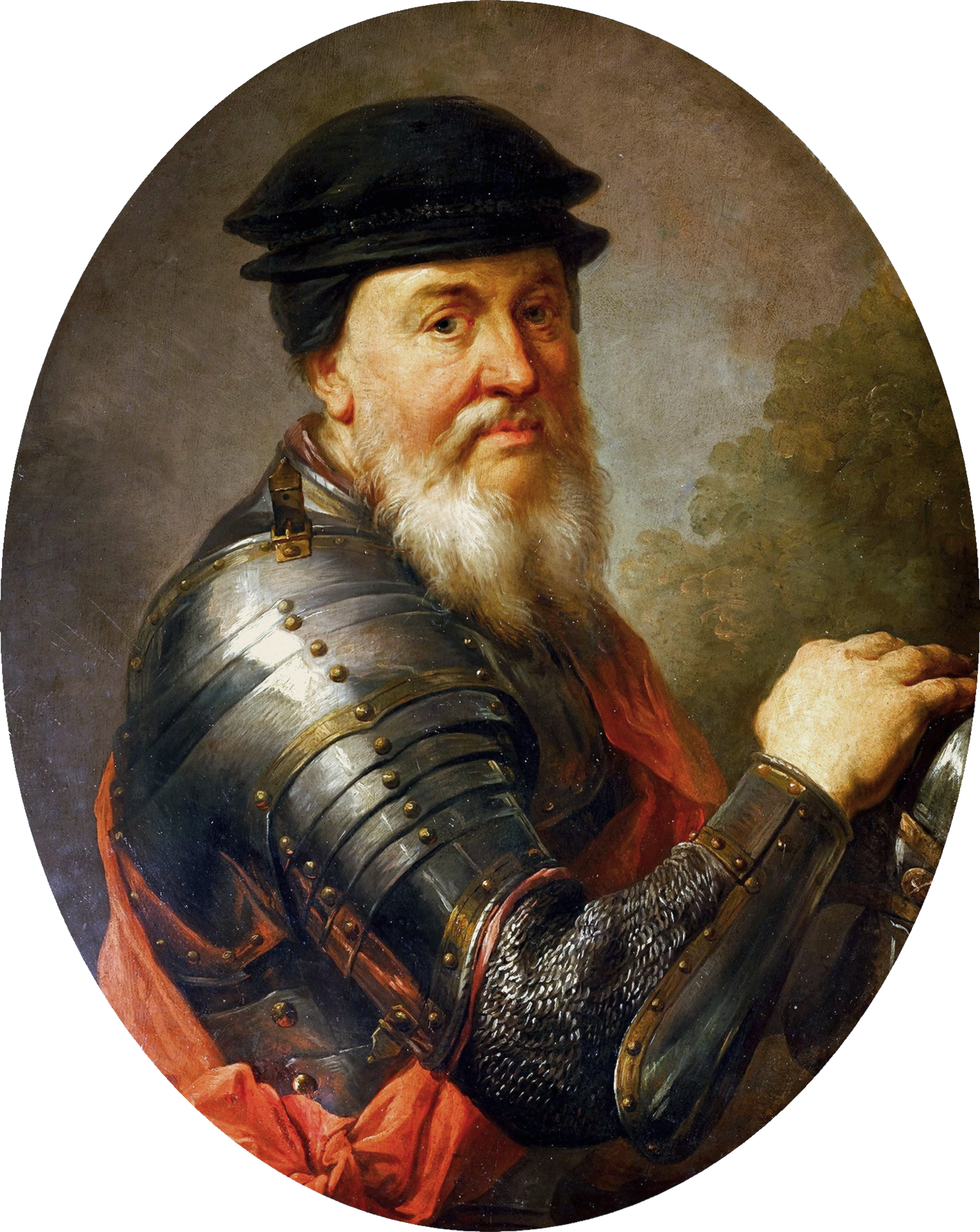
- Coat of arms: Leliwa
- Born: 1488; Tarnów, Poland
- Died: 16 May 1561 (aged 72–73); Wiewiórka, Poland
- Noble family: House of Tarnowski
- Spouses: Barbara Tęczyńska; Zofia Szydłowiecka
- Issue: with Barbara Tęczyńska; Jan Aleksander Tarnowski; Jan Amor Tarnowski with Zofia Szydłowiecka; Zofia Tarnowska; Jan Krzysztof Tarnowski
- Father: Jan Amor Junior Tarnowski
- Mother: Barbara of Rożnów

Jan Amor Tarnowski (Latin: Joannes Tarnovius; 1488 – 16 May 1561) was a Polish nobleman, knight, military commander, military theoretician, and statesman of the Crown of the Kingdom of Poland. He was Grand Crown Hetman from 1527, and was the founder of the city of Tarnopol, where he built the Ternopil Castle and the Ternopil Pond. The first Count of the Holy Roman Empire in the Tarnowski family (1547).

== History ==
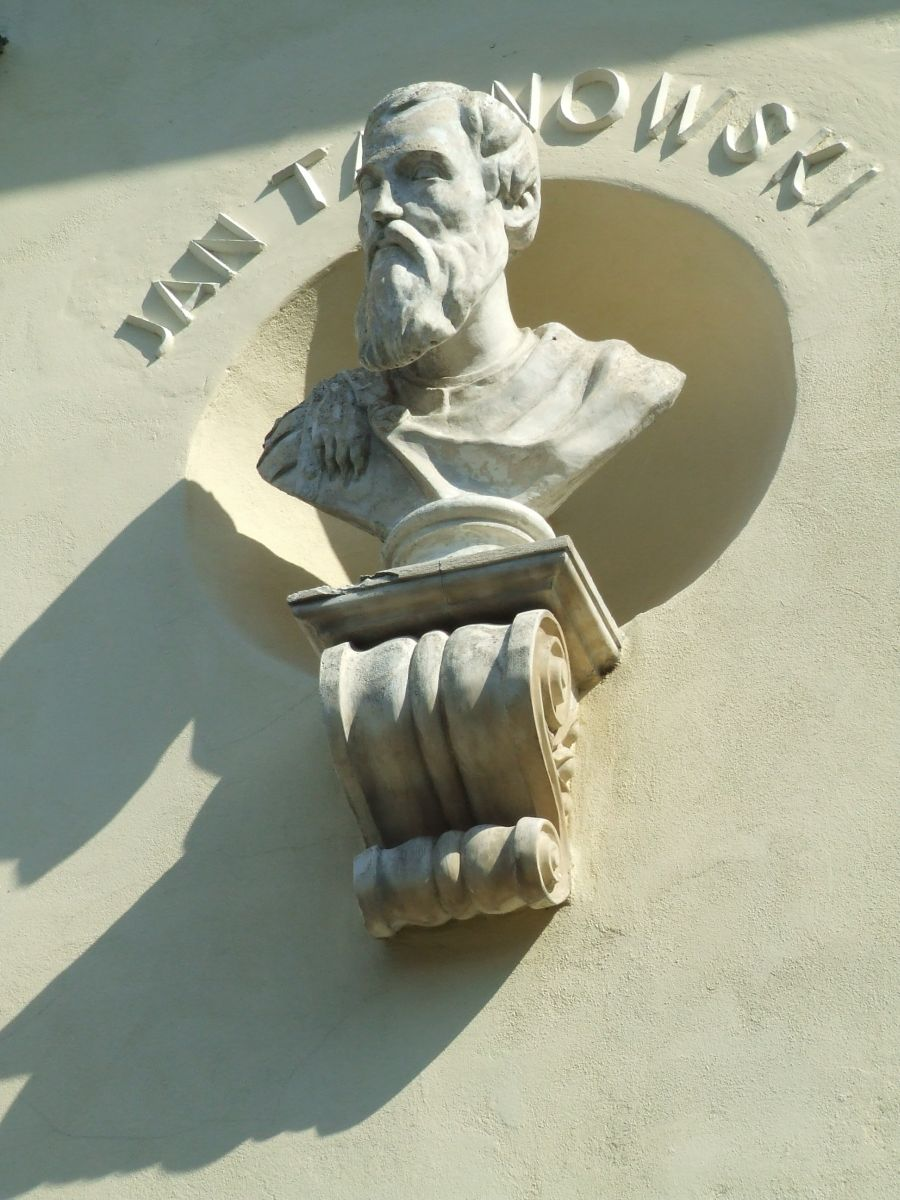
Bust of Tarnowski on the Krasiński Palace in Ursynów.

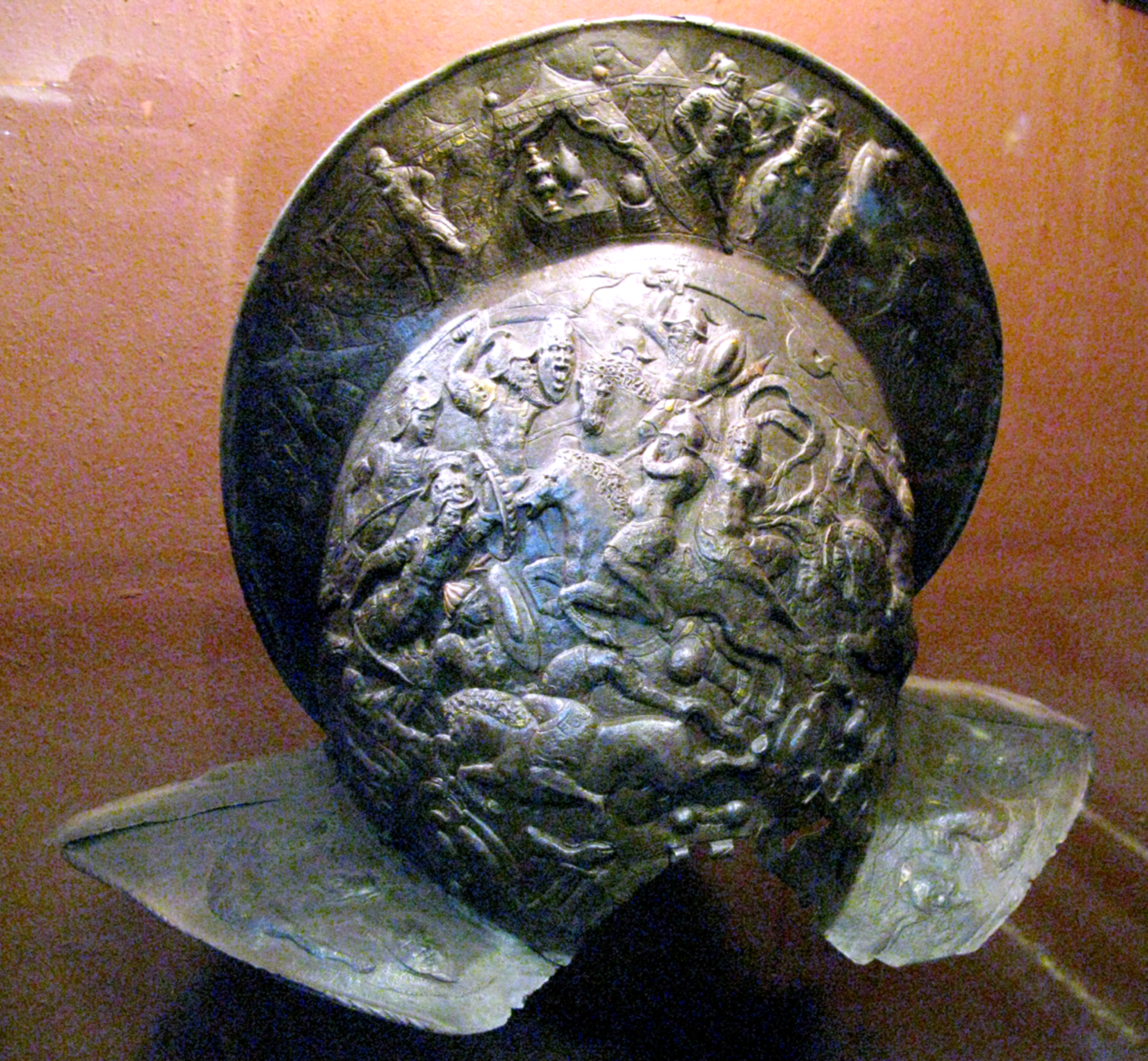
Tarnowski's parade burgonet morion helmet.

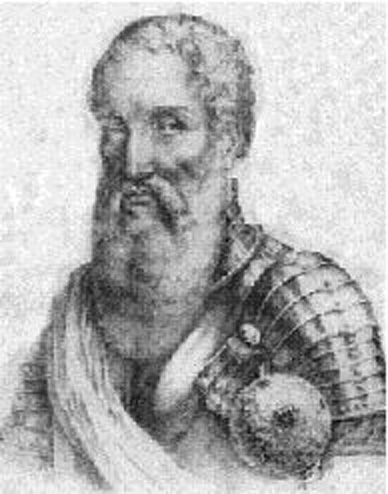
Hetman Tarnowski

Tarnowski was born in 1488, the son of Jan Amor Junior Tarnowski, castellan of Kraków, and his second wife Barbara of Rożnów, granddaughter of the knight Zawisza the Black. He was a scion of an important family clan started in the mid-14th century by Spycimir Leliwita, castellan of Kraków. Tarnowski had five half-siblings from his father's first marriage: Jan Amor the Elder, Jan Aleksander (d. 1497), Katarzyna, Zofia and Elżbieta. He had also five half-sisters from his mother's first marriage. He spent his earliest years in Rożnowo and Stare Sioło. He was originally intended to become a priest, but after his father's death in 1500, his mentor Maciej Drzewiecki convinced Barbara of Rożnowo to abandon this plan. In 1501, Tarnowski was sent to the king's court, but on 17 June 1501, King John I Albert died and he returned to Rożnowo, to his mother's domain.

In 1508, Tarnowski fought against Muscovy in the battle of Orsza; in 1509, against Moldavia in the battle of Chocim, and upon the Dniester as a commander of his own chorągiew (banner/company). In 1512, he was involved in the battle of Łopuszna, in which the Tatars were defeated by the Polish forces.

He made a pilgrimage to the Holy Land, and in 1518 became a knight of the Order of the Holy Sepulchre in Jerusalem. He travelled extensively across Europe, and was knighted by King Manuel I of Portugal for his services against the Moors in Africa.

Tarnowski was the owner of Tarnów, Wiewiórka, Rożnów, Przeworsk, and Stare Sioło. In 1522, he became castellan of Wojnicz; in 1527, voivode of the Ruthenian Voivodeship; in 1535, voivode of the Kraków Voivodeship. In 1536, he became castellan of Kraków and starost of Sandomierz, Stryj, Żydaczów, Dolina, Sandecz, Chmielnów, Lubaczów and Horodło.

In 1521, he participated in the Ottoman–Habsburg wars. He was among the first Hetmans of the Polish Army after its great reforms. He led the Polish Army to many victories, among them the battles of Obertyn against the Moldavians in 1531, and seizing Starodub from the Muscovites and executing its defenders in 1535 during the Muscovite wars.

In 1545, the Archbishop of Gniezno, Piotr Gamrat, granted hetman Tarnowski a papal brief with indulgences and privileges granted by Pope Paul III in 1535, and in 1547 he was awarded by Emperor Charles V with a diploma of the counts of the Holy Roman Empire – this title was to apply to the hetman and his descendants.

Tarnowski developed, among other things, horse artillery, field hospitals financed by the government, headquarters services, and field sappers. Throughout his entire service as a hetman, he preached a doctrine of flexibility.

Poet Jan Kochanowski wrote a poem O śmierci Jana Tarnowskiego (On the death of Jan Tarnowski). He is also one of the characters depicted in Jan Matejko's painting Prussian Homage.

== Family ==
In about 1511, Tarnowski married Barbara Tęczyńska, daughter of Mikołaj Tęczyński, voivode of the Ruthenian Voivodeship. She was the niece of his mother's first husband. After her death, Tarnowski married Zofia Szydłowiecka in 1530. He had four children, among them Zofia Tarnowska and Jan Krzysztof Tarnowski.

== Important works ==
- Terminatio ex itinerario, fragmenty ogł. K. Hartleb "Itinerarium J. Tarnowskiego z pobytu w Ziemi Św. z r. 1518", Kwartalnik Historyczny 1930; rękopis: Biblioteka Czartoryskich, Teki Naruszewicza nr 33, r. 1518, (dziennik podróży do Ziemi Świętej w roku 1517; cz. 1 po łacinie, cz. 2 po polsku);
- Pouczenie hetmana podskarbiemu koronnemu dane, powst. 1528, ogł. S. Kutrzeba "Polskie ustawy i artykuły wojskowe od XV do XVIII wieku", Kraków 1939, PAU Archiwum Komisji Historii Wojskowej nr 3, pp. 38–39;
- 4 speeches from 1537, in Stanisław Orzechowski Annales, Dobromil 1611 and later editions;
- 2 speeches (pt. Głos [...] miany [...] na sejmie piotrkowskim 1548 roku; Mowa [...] na sejmie lubelskim 1554 miana), in A. Małecki "Wybór mów staropolskich", Kraków 1860, Biblioteka Polska, series V, book 6-8, pp. 33–34;
- Consilium rationis bellicae, Tarnów 1558, printshop of Łazarz Andrysowic; in M. Malinowski Stanisława Łaskiego, wojewody sieradzkiego, prace naukowe i dyplomatyczne, Wilno 1864, pp. 173–249; also in A. Piliński, Poznań 1879; pt. "Zasady sztuki wojskowej", Lwów 1882, Biblioteka Mrówki nr 147;
- Artykuły wojenne, in I. Polkowski "Sprawy wojenne króla Stefana Batorego. Dyjaryjusze, relacyje, listy i akta z lat 1576-1586", Kraków 1887, Acta Historica Res Gestas Poloniae Illustrantia, t. 11, p. 240 nn.; there: Oprawianie zamków albo miast, before 1561; reprint S. Kutrzeba "Polskie ustawy i artykuły wojskowe od XV do XVIII wieku", Kraków 1939, PAU Archiwum Komisji Historii Wojskowej nr 3, pp. 313–319;
- De bello cum iuratissimis Christianae fidei hostibus Turcis gerendo disputatio sapientissima, Würzburg 1595, printshop of G. Fleichsamnn, (edition by J. G. Schedius with explanation); next printing: Selectissimarum orationum et consultationum de bello Turcico variorum et diversorum auctorum libri XIV, Frankfurt 1598–1599; also in 2, volume 4, part 2, Leipzig (1595), pp. 1–17; Conring De bello contra Turcas gerendo, 1664;
- O obronie koronnej i o sprawie i powinności urzędników wojennych, Kraków 1579, Łazarz printshop (published with Ustawy prawa ziemskiego polskiego [...] attributed to Jan Palczowski ); reprint: M. Malinowski Stanisława Łaskiego, wojewody sieradzkiego, prace naukowe i dyplomatyczne, Wilno 1864, pp. 173–249; K. J. Turowski edition, Kraków 1858, Biblioteka Polska, notebook 133–134;
- Kronika polska, work lost.

== Bibliography ==
- Consilium rationis bellicae Jana Tarnowskiego, Kraków 1858
- Ustawy prawa ziemskiego polskiego, dla pamięci lepszej krótko i porządnie z statutów i z konstytucyj zebrane, z przydatkiem: O obronie koronnej, i o sprawie i powinności urzędników wojennych, Jego M. Pana Jana Tarnowskiego niekiedy kasztelana krakowskiego etc. etc., temi czasy rycerskiemu stanowi barzo potrzebne, Kraków 1858
- Kasper Niesiecki,Polish Armorial - "Korona Polska przy złotey wolnosci starożytnemi Rycerstwa Polskiego y Wielkiego Xięstwa Litewskiego kleynotami naywyższymi Honorami Heroicznym, Męstwem y odwagą, Wytworną Nauką a naypierwey Cnotą, nauką Pobożnością, y Swiątobliwością ozdobiona Potomnym zaś wiekom na zaszczyt y nieśmiertelną sławę Pamiętnych w tey Oyczyźnie Synow podana TOM [...] Przez X. Kaspra Niesieckego Societatis Jesu", Lwów (Lviv), 1738, vol 9.
- Stanisław Orzechowski, Life and death of Jan Tarnowski, Żywot i śmierć Jana Tarnowskiego (written 1561), Franciszek Bohomolec ed., Radom 1830.
