= Mikołaj Sieniawski =

Polish magnate, military commander and politician

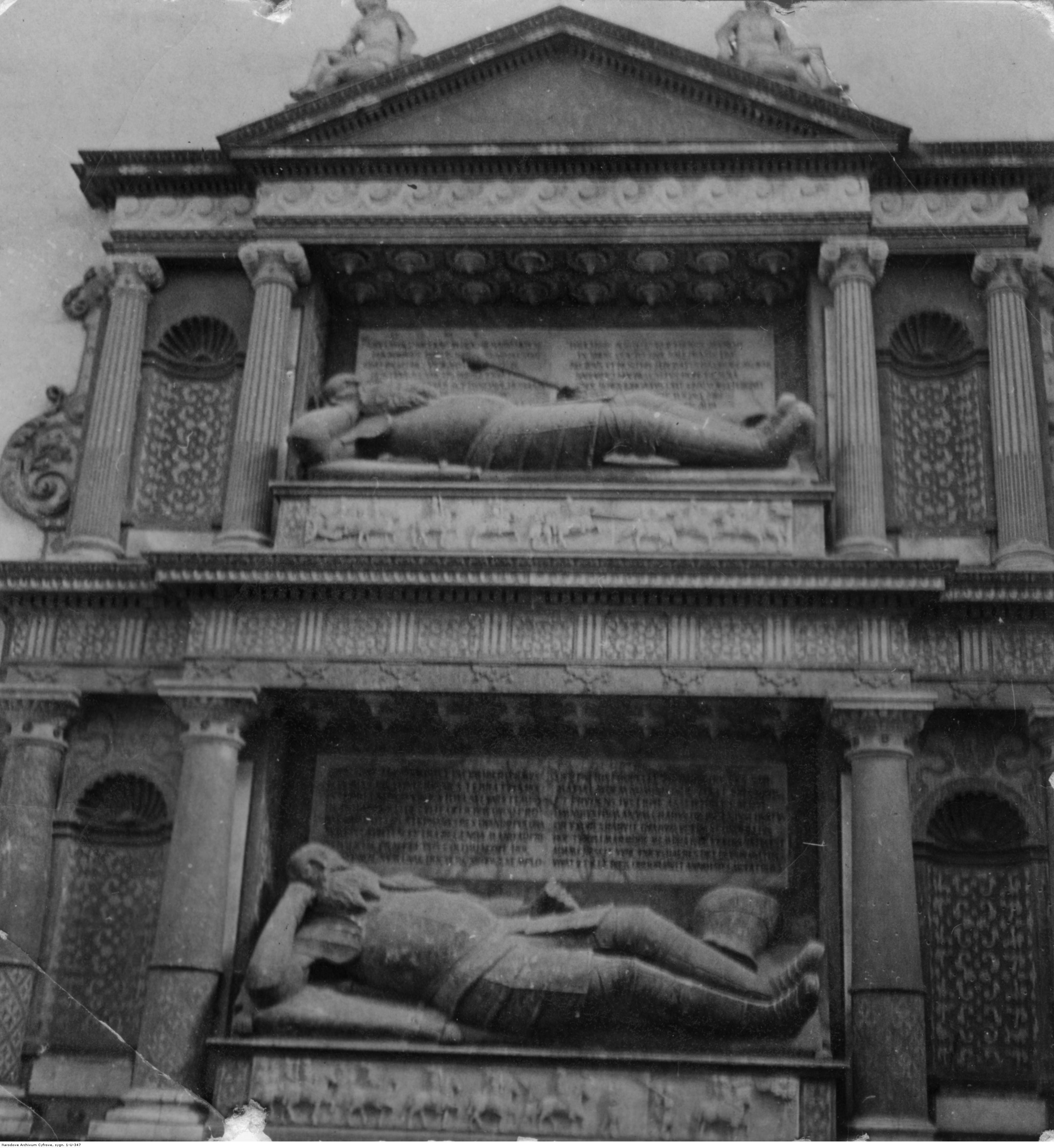

Mikołaj Sieniawski (c. 1489 – 1569) was a Polish magnate, military commander and a prominent politician of his times. He built stone Brzeżany Castle round which the modern town of Berezhany has developed.

Since 1539 Mikołaj Sieniawski served as a Field Hetman of the Crown and took part in most wars Poland was engaged in. Most notably he organized several successful raids to the area of the Ottoman Empire and Crimea. He took part in the battle of Obertyn in 1531, under hetman Jan Tarnowski, from whom he adopted the clan crest of Leliwa. Between 1542 and 1553 he was also the voivode of Belz, and after that time he rose to be a voivod of the Ruthenian Voivodship, one of the richest and most populous regions of the Republic. In 1563 he was promoted to the rank of Grand Crown Hetman, that is the de facto commander in chief of the Polish army.
