= Shlomo Kluger =

Solomon ben Judah Aaron Kluger (1785–June 9, 1869) (Hebrew: שלמה בן יהודה אהרן קלוגר), known as the Maggid of Brody, was chief dayyan and preacher of Brody, Galicia. He was successively Rabbi at Rava-Ruska (Galicia), Kulikow (Galicia), and Józefów (Lublin), preacher at Brody, and Rabbi at Brezany (Galicia) and, again, at Brody (where he held the offices of Dayan and preacher for more than fifty years). He died at Brody on June 9, 1869.

== Biography ==
Shlomo Kluger was born in Komarów, Austrian Galicia, in what is present-day Poland.

== Rabbinic career ==
As one of the leading rabbinic authorities of his day, Kluger issued rulings on many complex halachic questions. One of his most notable decisions was that not only did machine made matzo not meet the halachic requirements necessary to properly fulfill the requirement of eating matzo on Pesach, but that it very possibly had the status of leavened bread, consumption of which is strictly prohibited on Pesach. Rabbi Yosef Shaul Nathanson published a strongly worded rebuttal to the points Kluger had raised, and argued that on the contrary, machine made matzo was superior in all respects to the hand made version. The issue evolved into a significant controversy, many points of which are still debated today. Kluger, in the course of his research into the subject, came to the conclusion that he had received a somewhat inaccurate description of the technical operational details of the machines, and modified his position accordingly.

Kluger was well known for his fierce opposition to the haskalah movement, and his firm adherence to tradition. In his responsa, Kluger discusses an incident where a group gathered to study the controversial works of Moses Mendelssohn. A quarrel erupted, and Mendelssohn's books were seized and burnt. Kluger wrote that while the burning of the books was probably not the appropriate course of action, they were certainly correct to be enraged and to protest the study of Mendelssohn's work. Kluger explained that he saw fit to condemn Mendelssohn and his works for several reasons. Among his arguments, he wrote

...and furthermore, go out and see what his students, and all those who study his books, are - they are all complete evildoers... And his books are not studied except by the most worthless people, who violate the whole Torah... And every person who fears heaven flees from him like from a snake or scorpion.

== Published works ==
During his long life Rabbi Kluger wrote a great number of works—one hundred and sixty volumes. He wrote on all the branches of rabbinical literature as well as on Biblical and Talmudic exegesis. Many of these writings remain in manuscript form. Among his published works are:

- Ha-elef lekha Shelomo - Responsa. First published posthumously in 1910.
- Sefer Ha-Chayim (Zolkiev, 1825), novellæ on Shulchan Aruch, Orach Chayim (some of his novellæ on the section "Even Ha-Ezer" were published later under the title "Chochmas Shlomo"; novellae on the other parts of the Shulchan Aruch have not been published)
- Mei Niddah (ib. 1834), halachic and haggadic novellæ on Gemara Niddah
- Mogen Ovos, commentary on Pirkei Ovos
- Eyn Dim'ah (part 1; ib. 1834), funeral sermon on the death of Rabbi Ephraim Zalman Margalios
- Evel Yachid (Warsaw, 1836), funeral oration on Rabbi Menachem Manis Mordechai Teomim
- Nidrei Zerizin (Zolkiev, 1839), novellæ on Gemara Nedarim
- Evel Mosheh (with Eyn Dim'ah, part 2; Warsaw, 1843), funeral orations on Rabbi Moshe Schreiber (Sofer) and Rabbi Yaakov Orenstein (author of the Yeshuos Yaakov) (available as a free download from HebrewBooks.org)
- Shenos Chayim (Lemberg, 1855; the first part contains responsa on Shulchan Aruch, Orach Chayim; the second, responsa and novellæ for scribes)
- Sefer Stam (ib. 1856), laws for scribes
- Modo'ah Le-Beis Yisrael (Breslau, 1859), responsa, chiefly of other Rabbis, concerning matzot made by machine
- Tuv Ta'am Ve-Da'as (Lemberg, 1860; the first part contains the laws of tereifah; the second, entitled Kin'as Soferim, contains laws for scribes and various laws of the Yoreh De'ah)
- Chiddushei Anshei Shem (Leipzig, 1860), novellæ on Shulchan Aruch, Even Ha-Ezer
- Ma'aseh Yedei Yozer (Lemberg, 1863), commentary on the Pesach Haggadah
- Sefer Avodas Avodah (Zolkiev, 1865), novellæ on Avodah Zarah
- Rabbi Kluger's takkanos concerning slaughtering are printed in Rabbi Ganzfried's Toras Zevach (Lemberg, 1848), and two of his responsa in Rabbi David Solomon Eybeschütz's Ne'os Deshe (ib. 1861).

== Students ==
- Yosef Dov Soloveitchik (Beis Halevi)
- David Meir Frisch
