= David Meir Frisch =

19th century rabbi

Rabbi David Meir Frisch (דוד מאיר פריש, Dawid Majer Frisch, David Mayer Frisch; c. 1812 – April 25, 1882) was a 19th-century rabbinical authority.

== Early life and lineage ==
David Meir Frisch was born around 1812 in the town of Rohatyn, in western Ukraine, a part of Austria-Hungary at the time. The region was known as Galicia.

Nothing is known of his early years. Neither is the date of his appointment as Rabbi of Berezhany known

An essay by Rabbi Joseph Lewinstein titled "My Kin the "Pene Yehoshua" (Yaakov Yehoshua ben Tzvi Hirsch), traces Rabbi David Meir's lineage to the "Pene Yehoshua".

The maternal fourth generation ancestor of the "Pene Yehoshua", (Joshua Höschel ben Joseph) (1578–1648), himself was the author of a classical commentary on Rashi, the "Meginnei Shelomo" (Amsterdam, 1715), and a collection of responsa, also titled "(Sheeilot uTeshuvot) Pene Yehoshua" (Amsterdam, 1715).

== Letter of rabbinical ordination ==
A copy of his rabbinical ordination letter (Hormana) (הורמנא) from Rabbi Shlomo Kluger (1785–1869) is preserved in the opening pages of his only surviving printed work, the Responsa "Yad Meir", (שו"ת יד מאיר) printed in Lemberg in 1881.

This letter, dated in 1840 in Brody, speaks of Rabbi Frisch in laudatory phrases, attests that he engaged him in Halachic arguments on several occasions and although "I vowed not to issue (letters of ordination) to any one, my vow didn't envisage a person of his stature".

== Literary correspondence ==
Rabbi Frisch addressed queries to many of the rabbinical luminaries of his time, dealing with questions of law, covering all four parts of the Shulchan Aruch, including ritual, marital, monetary and civil matters. To the extent that responsa answering these queries were printed, they appear in the collections of the following luminaries:

- Rabbi Shlomo Kluger -approx. 20 responsa
- Rabbi Mordechai Zeev Ettinger (1804–1863) – 2 responsa
- Rabbi Shlomo Driemer (1800*-1873) – 2 responsa
- Rabbi Joseph Saul Nathansohn (1808–1875) – 11 responsa
- Rabbi Isaac Aron Ettinga (1827–1891) – 2 responsa
- Rabbi Abraham Benjamin Kluger(1841–1916)- 1 responsum
- Rabbi Samuel Isaac Schorr (1839–1902) – 1 responsum
- Rabbi Abraham Teomim (1814–1868) – 1 responsum.

In addition to his responsa in the Yad Meir, two more responsa have been printed in the works of other authors. Two manuscript responsa were published in recent years in two Talmudic journals. Part of this material was printed in softcover in 2005 on the occasion of the marriage of a great-great-granddaughter in Brooklyn, New York.

While the above appears to comprise virtually all that is known of his output, the author in the foreword of the Yad Meir alludes to "many works" completed by him, going back to the years of his youth, encompassing the entire Babylonian Talmud, another work on the Shulchan Aruch, the Halachot of Niddah, similar in format to the classic "Simlah Chadashah" and the related commentary "Tevuot Shor" of Rabbi Alexander Sender Schor (d. 1737), "a large work"; in addition to a work on Avoth and on the Torah. "I answered many questioners and I give priority to publish [herein] a few of my responsa so that they shall not be forgotten"

At the end of Foreword he alludes that he did not have the means to publish his works and only now, at the prompting of his Rebbetzin, Shaindel, did he print selected responsa "now that our offspring are married off".

The Foreword is dated June 17, 1881. Rabbi David Meir Frisch died ten months later.

== Words of Torah quoted in Divrei Shaul ==
In a recent edition of "Divrei Shaul" of Rabbi Joseph Saul Nathansohn (the "Shaul uMeishiv", as he is known in Talmudic literature), the index cites four instances of quotes from Rabbi David Meir Frisch, "Dayan of Berezhany". Chief Rabbi of Lemberg and a towering giant of the rabbinic world of the 19th century, Rabbi Nathansohn was a native of Berezhany and his father the Gaon Rabbi Arye Leib(ush) Nathanson, himself a Talmudic author, continuned to reside in Berezhany and attended the synagogue of Rabbi David Meir Frisch.

== Responsa "Yad Meir" ==
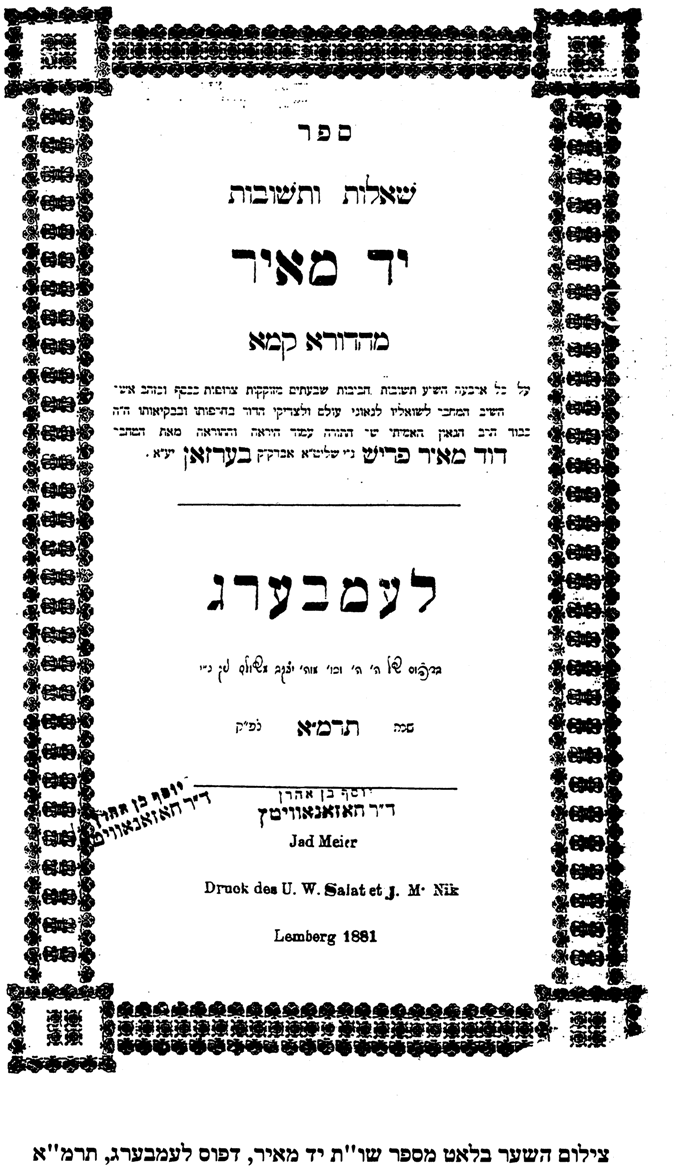
Front page of the "Yad Meir"

The "Yad Meir" (translated "Hand of Meir") was published in Lemberg (now Lviv) in 1881, in the year before his passing. It contains 56 responsa (Nos. 1 to 57, with No. 32 missing), most of them addressed to well-known talmudic scholars of his time, including his sons. The numerical value of the Hebrew word "yad" is 14, the same as the value of "David", the author's first name. "Yad" is also the acronym of "Yad David", while Meir is the author's middle name.

Rather than laity, the majority of the questioners in the Yad Meir were rabbis and rabbinical judges (Av Beit Din (AB"D) or Dayan), but not all are identified. The following questioners are identified:

- Rabbi Joshua Falk Zeev (Wolfsohn), AB"D Akna, Moldavia (#1, 2)
- Rabbi David Silber, Dayan, Berezhany (#3, 5, 20, 27)
- Rabbi Hillel Lichtenstein, (1815–1891) AB”D Kolomyia (#4)
- #6 – This responsum, as all the others, is undated and doesn't identify the questioners other than "all the sages of Podhajce" (now Pidhaitsi, Ukraine). The following served there in a senior rabbinic capacity at the time: Rabbi Simon Melier (1810*-1880*), his son Rabbi Nota Jonah Melier (1850*-1910*), or perhaps Rabbi Simon Lilianfeld (1857–1910)(See #13)
- The Righteous Rabbi Uri of Rohatyn (1820–1889)(#7)
- Rabbi Baruch Frisch (1853–1920*) – son of the author. During World War I refugee in Budapest, returned to Berezhany after it ended, date of his passing unknown.(#11, 37)
- Rabbi Gavriel Menkes, AB”D Sambor (Sambir) (d. 1878) (#12)
- Rabbi Shalom Lilianfeld, AB"D Podhajce (1857–1910)(#13, see also #6)
- Rabbi Simon Melier, AB"D Podhajce (1810*-1880*)(#17, see also #6)
- Rabbi Shlomoh Frisch, (1849–1874) son of the author, died young.(#18, 33)
- Rabbi Joseph Pechier, Dayan, Tysmienica (Tysmenytsia) (#22)
- Rabbi David Ber Leiter, AB"D Zawalow (Zavaliv) (1846–1912) (#24, 25)
- Rabbi Moshe Moshil ", AB”D Teatro, Moldavia (#28)
- Rabbi Eliezer Schatzberg, Dayan, Zborow (Zboriv) (#30)
- Rabbi Israel Arye Frisch – brother of author.(#31)
- Rabbi Abraham Benjamin Kluger, son of the Gaon Rabbi Shlomo Kluger (1841–1916) (#34)
- Rabbi Jonah Melier, AB”D Podhajce (1850–1914) (#35)
- Rabbi Arye Leib(ush) Nathansohn of Berezhany, father of the Gaon Joseph Saul Nathansohn (1790–1873)
- Rabbi Pinchas Burstyn, AB”D Sereth (Siret), Bukovina (1829–1906) (#40, 41)
- Rabbi Mottel Frisch – son of author (#42, 44)
- Rabbi Baruch Meir Frisch AB”D Czortków (1820*-1899) (#43)
- Rabbi Tuvyah Klahr, scholar, Zborow (Zboriv) (#45)
- Rabbi Samuel Chayim Gabel, Dayan, Tlumacz (Tlumach) (#48)
- Rabbi Bezalel Ginsburg, Dayan, Tarnopol (Ternopil) (#50)
- Rabbi Joel Moskowicz, Schotz, (1810–1886) son-in-law of the Righteous Rabbi Meir of Premyslany (Peremyshliany) (#51)
- Rabbi Samuel Schapira, Dayan, Dobromil (Dobromyl) (1855–1928) (#54)
- Rabbi Israel AB”D, Novoselic, Bessarabia (#55)
- The Righteous Holy Rabbi Meir of Premyslany (Peremyshliany)
- Rabbi Saul Horowitz 7)

The original Yad Meir is out of print, but appears in the catalogs of the Hebrew University Library, The Smithsonian Institution Hebrew Section, The Yeshiva University Library, Jewish Theological Seminary Library, New York Public Library, The catalogue of Hebrew Books in the British Museum, ed. S. Van Straalen, 1894, the large online database http://hebrewbooks.org/523, and others.

== Later years ==
Two young talmudic scholars of rabbinic provenance, Yechiel Mechal Leiter and Yaakov Geller, who studied together, decided to address their Talmudic/Halachic queries to a number of the rabbinical luminaries of their time, and published the responsa received in Lemberg in 1886, under the title “Mazkeret Ahavah” . It includes a short responsum from Rabbi David Meir Frisch, z”tzl..

It is undated. It states that "I received your letter yesterday, but I am bereft of strength and most of the day I am bedridden and the little I do move around in my home, it is hard for me to read…though I usually only respond to practical Halachic questions, but to such lovers and learners of Torah I shall answer two or three of your initial queries, but I cannot read more…"

It appears from the above that Rabbi Frisch had been ill for some time prior to his passing.
