= Eibenschütz =

Eibenschütz is a European Jewish surname whose origin is traced to the Moravian town of Ivančice - Eybenschütz in German.

Notable people with the surname include:

- Camilla Eibenschütz, German actress, daughter of Albert Eibenschütz
- David Solomon Eibenschütz, Russian rabbi and author; died in Safed, Palestine, 1812
- Ilona Eibenschütz, Hungarian pianist; born at Budapest
- Jonathan Eybeschütz (Jonathan Eibenschütz), Central European rabbi and Talmudist in 18th Century; born in Cracow

== See also ==
- Ivančice, a town in the Czech Republic whose name in German is "Eibenschütz"
- Eibenschütz family, German family
