= David Frisch =

David Frisch may refer to:

- David Frisch (American football) (born 1970), American football tight end
- David H. Frisch (1918–1991), physicist
- David Meir Frisch, 19th-century rabbinical authority
