= Volodymyr Sawchak =

Ukrainian Australian landscape painter

- Володимир Савчак
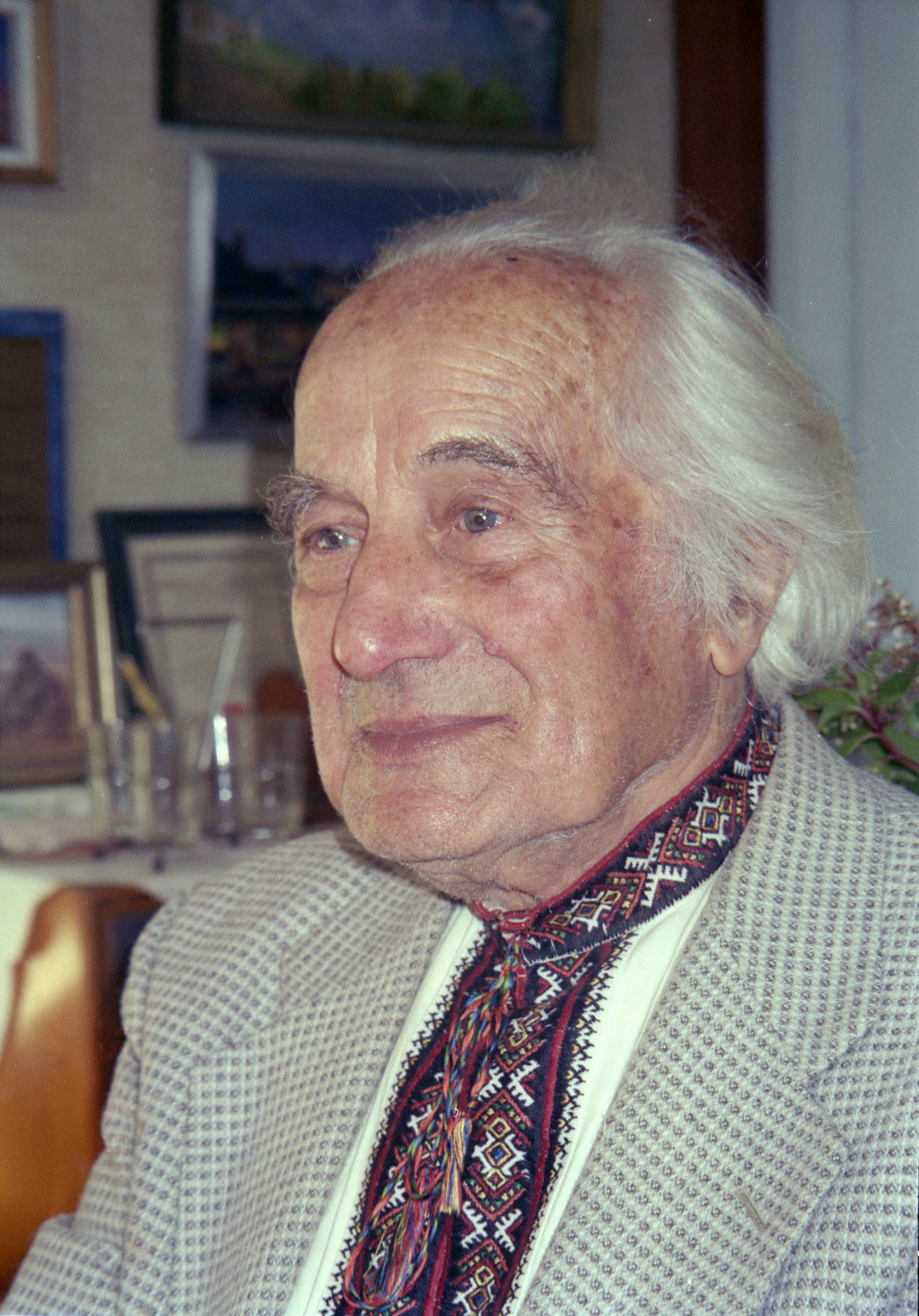
- Sawchak in 2001
- Born: Володимир Васильович Савчак; Volodymyr Vasyliovych Savchak; 25 May 1911; Adamivka, Berezhany, Galicia, Austria-Hungary (now Ukraine)
- Died: 6 March 2007 (aged 95)
- Resting place: Goloskovskiy Cemetery, Lviv, Ukraine
- Known for: landscapes, portraits
- Style: watercolors, pastels, acrylics, oils

Volodymyr Sawchak (Ukrainian: Володимир Савчак; 25 May 1911 – 6 March 2007) was a Ukrainian painter and activist based in Australia. Sawchak specialized in landscape paintings of Australian nature and was involved in Ukrainian cultural organisations.

== Biography ==
=== Early life ===
Volodymyr Vasyliovych Savchak (Ukrainian: Володимир Васильович Савчакwas) was born on 25 May 1911 to a wealthy family in Adamivka, Berezhany, Galicia in Austria-Hungary (present-day, Ukraine). His father, who was a master wheelmaker, had a workshop there as well.

=== Education ===
Volodymyr attended the Brzezhany Gymnasium, a secondary school, where he learned to draw. When he later enrolled in Plast, the Ukrainian national scout organization, he drew images, made maps, and occasionally decorated for Plast holidays. He was especially interested in painting landscapes.

During the Pacification of Ukrainians in Eastern Galicia by Poland in 1930, nineteen-year-old Volodymyr moved into Lviv to study philosophy, mathematics, and natural sciences. From 1934 to 1935 he studied painting at the Lviv University while maintaining contacts with the Lviv State College of Decorative and Applied Arts.

In 1935, he again moved, this time to Vilnius in order to attend the Academy of Arts, where he studied and worked until 1939. During this time, he was able to attend summer art camps for landscape studies at the Warsaw Academy of Arts. During the first Soviet occupation of Ukraine, Volodymyr was working at the Brzezhany Sokil Theater, and throughout the war he taught drawing at the Brzezhany Gymnasium. In 1948, he emigrated first to Germany and then to Australia.

=== In Australia ===
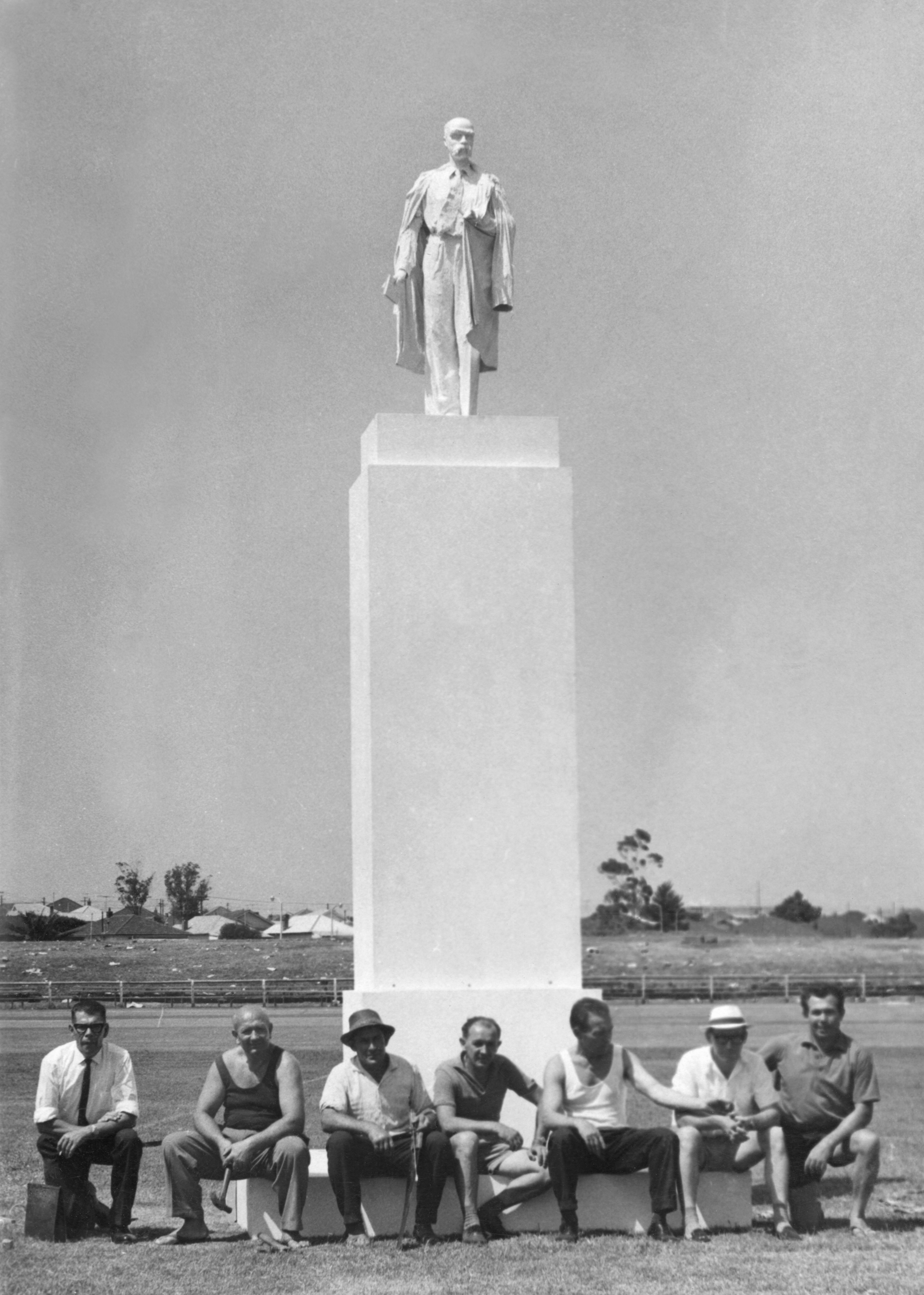
Volodymyr Sawchak (third from left) in Australia in 1964 at the dedication of a sculpture of Taras Shevchenko in Lidcombe

After arriving in Australia, Volodymyr fulfilled a two-year contract as an art teacher at a high school in Launceston, Tasmania. In 1951, Australia celebrated the 50th anniversary of its federation. An exhibition of newly arrived artists was organized and toured each state in the country. For showing his paintings at that exhibition, Volodymyr received a diploma from Minister of Immigration Harold Holt.

Seeking new subjects for his work, Volodymyr moved to central Australia in 1957 where he worked as an art teacher at the Catholic Mission of St. Teresa in Alice Springs.

Starting in 1954, he was a member of the Australian Federation of Ukrainian Organizations and the Board of the Foundation for Ukrainian Studies in Australia. He was active in the Plast scouting organization and was a member of the Lisovi Chorty (Forest Devils) fraternity. Additionally, he was a member of the Union for the Liberation of Ukraine and of the Ukrainian Community of Sydney. In the 1950s he taught a course in Ukrainian studies in Melbourne. In the 1960s he taught at two Ukrainian schools: Ivan Franko in Oxley and L. Ukrainka in Brisbane.

Volodymyr continued to participate in Ukrainian cultural life while in Australia, working on stage design and painting the Ukrainian Catholic Church of the Assumption of the Blessed Virgin Mary in Melbourne. For his contributions of the development of culture of his hometown of Brzezhany while in Australia, Volodymyr was awarded the title of "Honorary Citizen of Brzezhany".

Volodymyr Sawchak died on 6 March 2007 and was buried in the Holoski Cemetery in Lviv.

== Art ==
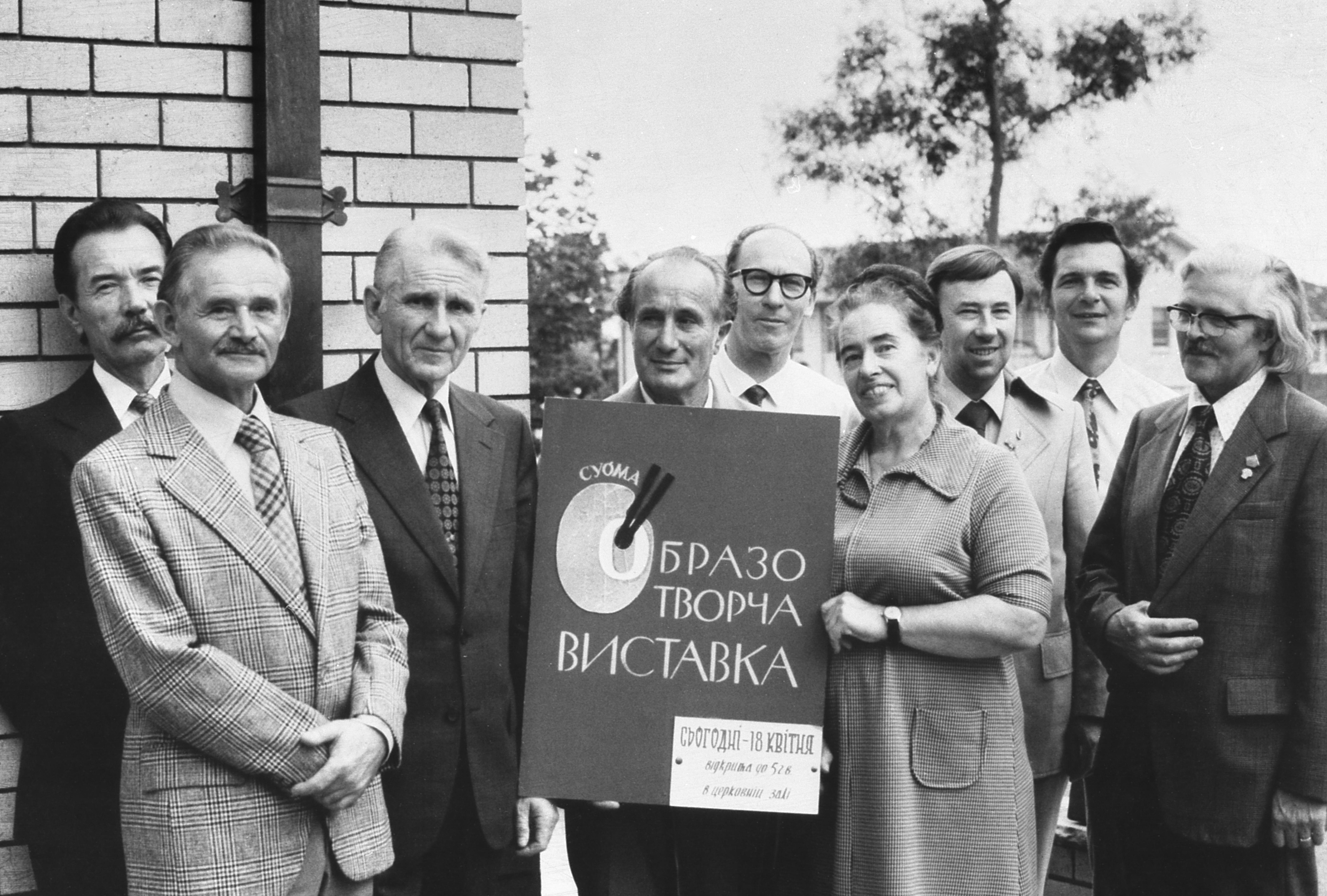
Volodymr Sawchak (middle, holding poster) with other members of the Ukrainian Artists Society of Australia at an exhibition in Lidcombe

Volodymyr Sawchak was a creator of Australian landscapes who used watercolors, pastels, acrylics, and oils. He was a member of the Ukrainian Artists Society of Australia and the Victoria Artists' Association. His works were shown at ten solo exhibitions in Australia, as well as six solo exhibitions in the United States, five in Canada, one in London, and one in Paris.

On 4 April 1956, the Australian newspaper The Age reported on the opening of one of Sawchak's paintings at the National Gallery of Victoria. Later, on 1 December 1959, it asserted his progress in paintings depicting central Australia, commenting on his skillful use of light and color and to the close artistic reflection to real life.

On 3 March 1963, Ukrainian-Australian magazine The Settler wrote about an exhibition of his in Sydney, calling Sawchak a "researcher" and "inventor" in the art world and praising his talent and unique view of the world. In response to the same exhibition, The Free Thought commented on the wide range of his work and his positive representation of Brzezhany and Ukraine.

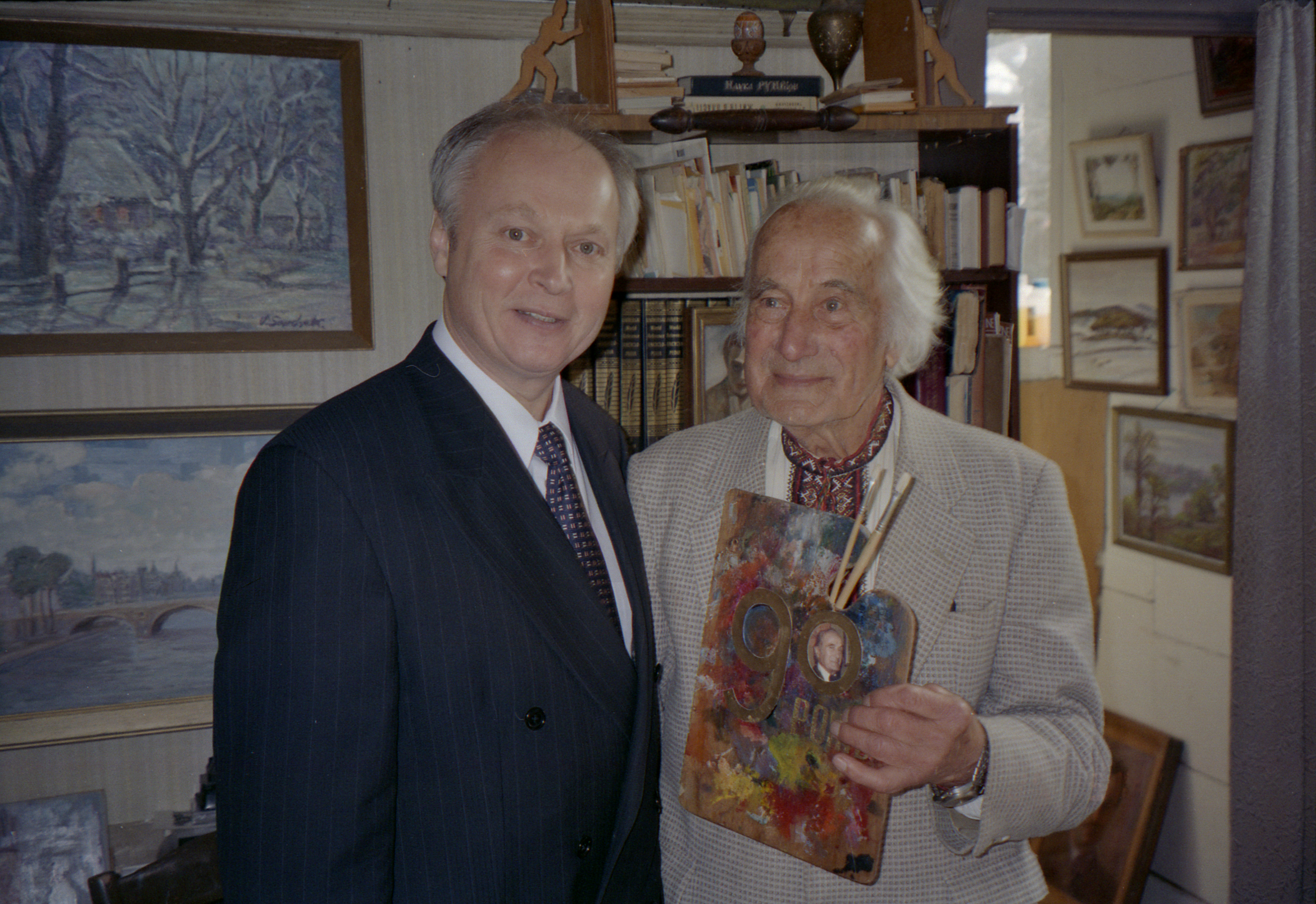
Volodymyr Sawchak receiving an award from Vasyl Korzachenko in 2001

At the Australian "Artists of the Blue Mountains" exhibition he received the Best Local Artist award. His works have been exhibited in Ukraine since 1993. In 2010, one of his most famous paintings, "Emily Gap in Central Australia", was exhibited at an art auction there.

=== Exhibitions ===
Solo Exhibitions
Date	Location	Event	Details	References
October 1954	Melbourne		30 paintings	
1956	Melbourne	National Gallery of Victoria		
1956	Adelaide			
October 1958	Melbourne	Exhibition of Ukrainian Books, Press, and Art		
September 1982	New York	Association of Ukrainian Artists of America		
June 1982	Toronto			
