= Saint Nicholas Church, Berezhany (wooden) =

Ukrainian church in Berezhany, Ukraine

Saint Nicholas Church
- Церква Святого Миколая
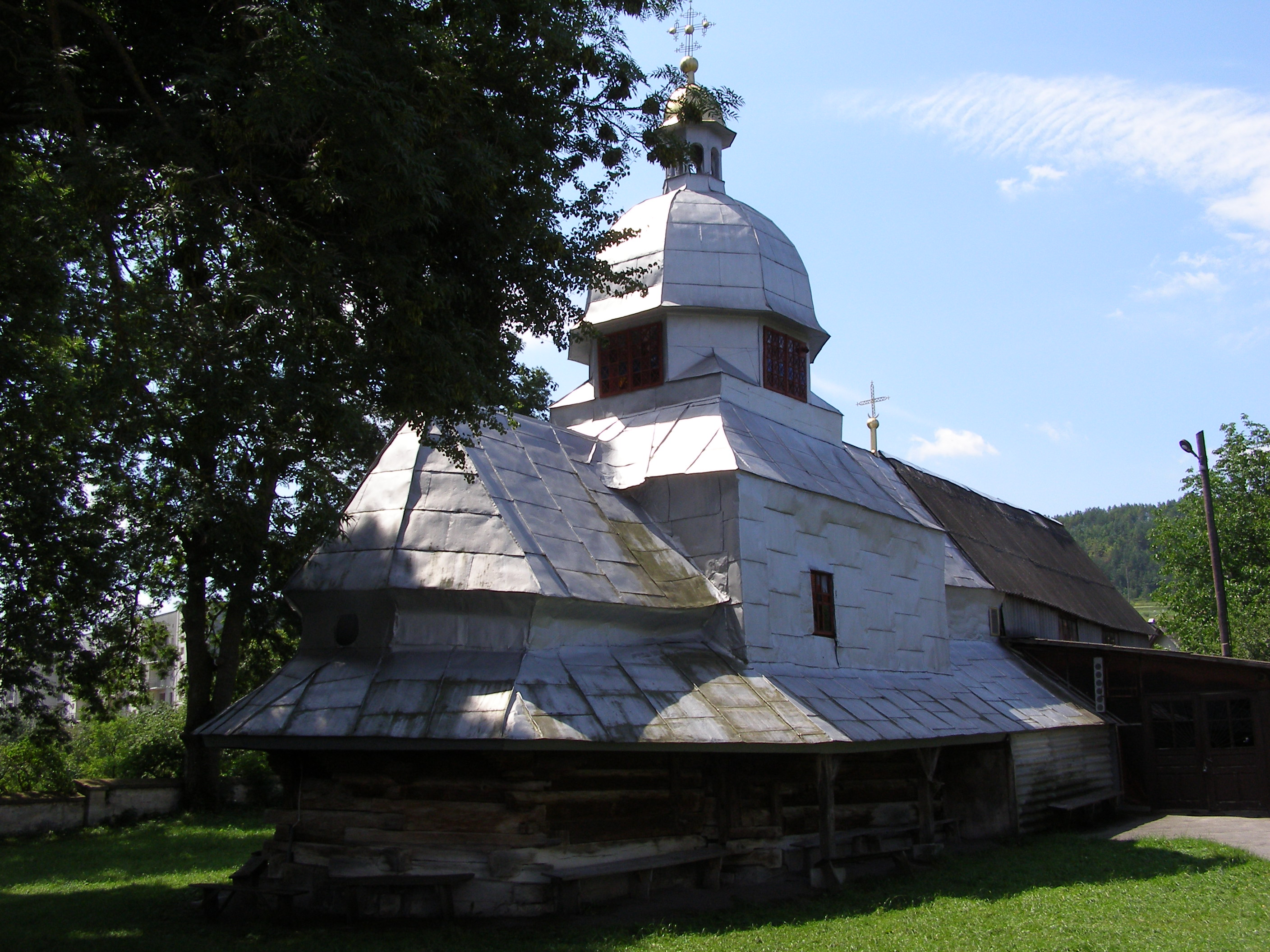

- Location within Ternopil Oblast

Location
- Location: Berezhany
- Coordinates: 49°26′08.9″N 24°56′31.2″E

Architecture
- Completed: 1691

Immovable Monument of National Significance of Ukraine
- Official name: Миколаївська церква (дер.) (St Nicholas Church (wooden))
- Type: Architecture
- Reference no.: 190036

Saint Nicholas Church (Ukrainian: Церква Святого Миколая) is a wooden church in Berezhany, Ternopil Oblast, and an architectural monument of national significance. It is located in Adamivka, in the southern part of the city. The monument is a striking example of the architectural works of the Galician school of wooden architecture.

Built in 1691. In 1827, the church was renovated by builder Kis Dan[ylo?], as evidenced by an inscription on the northern wall of the log structure.

== Architecture ==
The building is wooden, three-log, one-story. In terms of layout, it consists of a square nave, a narthex, and a pentagonal apse. The nave is taller and larger than the others. A wide porch is built on pillars with struts and curved brackets with a large overhang.

Inside, the walls of the nave transition into a high hall, and then, with the help of a flat bottom, are converted into a light octagon, which is supported by a closed log structure covered with a ceiling. The walls of the hall are reinforced with beams. The apse and narthex are covered with chopped segmental arches. The narthex opens into the nave with a high opening with a box-shaped arch, has a choir in the western part, and is illuminated by two small rectangular windows.

The log structures are not clad, which allows one to observe construction techniques characteristic of folk architecture, such as types of locks, vertical compressions, ties, figured crowns, etc.

== Iconostasis ==
Most likely, in the mid-18th century, the author of the carvings on the royal gates, some columns, the ark, the figures on it, and the frames of the side altar icons was a master from Zhovkva named Ihnatii Stobenskyi.

It is believed that the icons were created by Vasyl Petranovych together with his assistant Stanislav Otoselskyi, who also created icons for a similar iconostasis in the deanery St. Nicholas Church in Buchach.

== Bibliography ==
- Тихий Б. Церква св. Миколая на Адамівці // Бережани. Місто біля Раю / Пам'ятки України. — К., 2013. — спецвипуск No. 2 (191) (лип.). — С. 40–43.
