= Saints Peter and Paul Church, Berezhany =

Church in Berezhany, Ukraine

Saints Peter and Paul Church
- Костел святих апостолів Петра і Павла
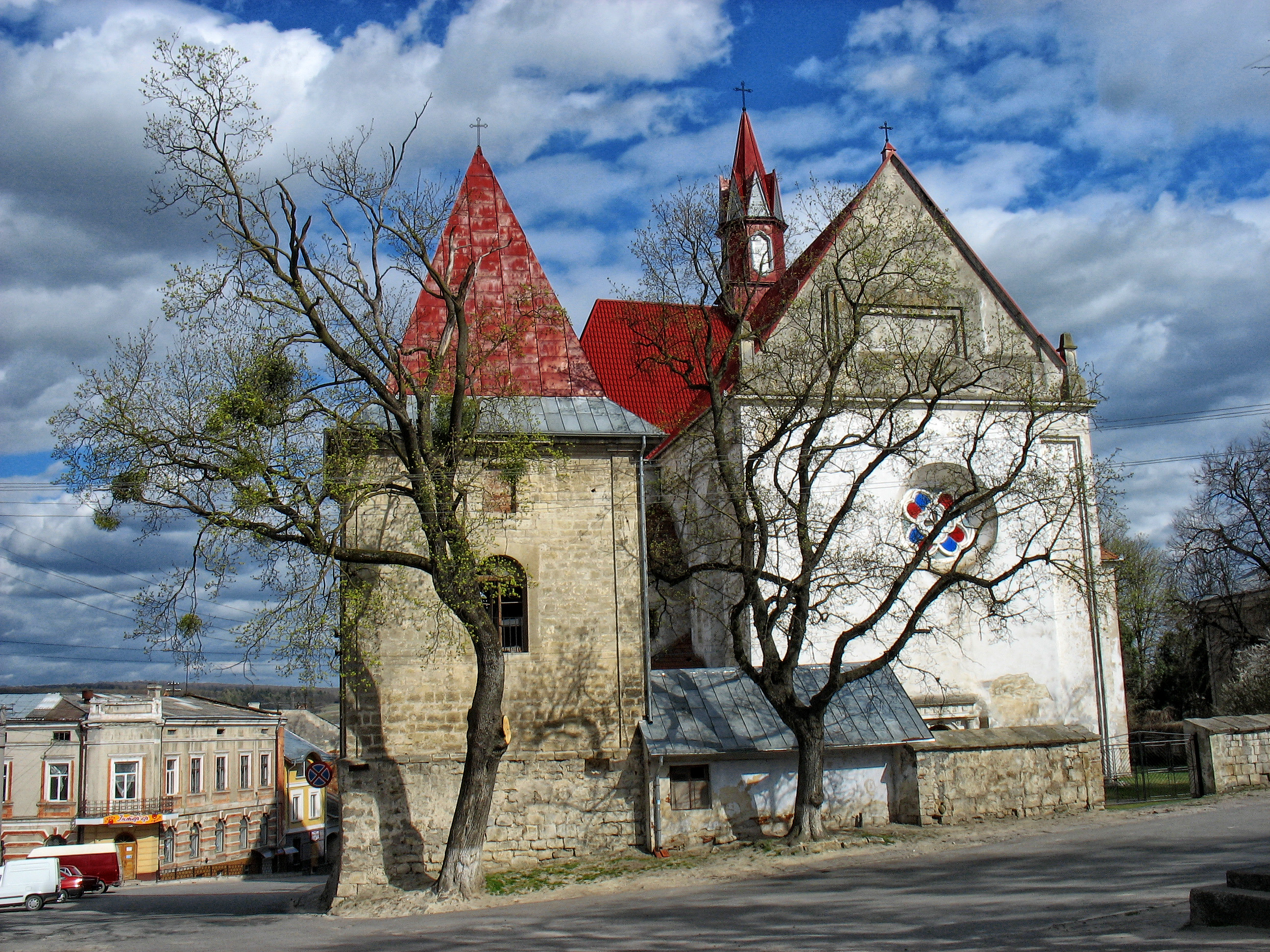

- Location within Ternopil Oblast

Religion
- Affiliation: Roman Catholic church

Location
- Location: Berezhany
- Coordinates: 49°26′37.60″N 24°56′16.00″E

Immovable Monument of National Significance of Ukraine
- Official name: Костел та дзвіниця (мур.) (Church and bell tower (stone))
- Type: Architecture
- Reference no.: 190035

Saints Peter and Paul Church (Ukrainian: Костел святих апостолів Петра і Павла; formerly the Church of the Nativity of the Virgin Mary, Ukrainian: Костел Різдва Пресвятої Богородиці) is a historic Roman Catholic church, parish church in Berezhany, Ternopil Oblast, and an architectural monument of national significance. Founded by the owners of the city, the Sieniawski family (according to other sources, by Adam Hieronim Sieniawski).

== History ==
The church was built between 1600 and 1620. The founders of the church were the owners of the town, the Sieniawski family. According to other sources, it was founded by Adam Hieronim Sieniawski, the Crown Cupbearer, who, however, was buried in another church in Brzeżany – in the castle chapel-church. On 31 August 1625, Jan Andrzej Próchnicki, Archbishop of Lviv, consecrated the church under the title of the Rebirth of the Virgin Mary and the Crucified Lord Jesus. Between 1679 and 1685, the church was renovated and rebuilt in the late Gothic style.

On 17 September 1775, with the consent of the Metropolitan Archbishop of Lviv, Wacław Hieronim Sierakowski, the Bishop of Nysa, Kryspin Cieszkowski, consecrated the church he had renovated and the high altar dedicated to the Nativity of the Blessed Virgin Mary. On 13 October 1776, Kryspin Cieszkowski consecrated the altars in the chapels: 1) of the Blessed Virgin Mary of the Rosary and St. John Kanty, 2) of St. Francis Xavier and St. Michael the Archangel, 3) of St. Mary Magdalene and St. Cajetan, 4) St. Anne and Mary, Virgin of Sorrows, as Patroness of the poor, 5) St. Joseph, Spouse of the Blessed Virgin Mary, and St. Crispin and St. Crispinian, Holy Martyrs, 6) St. John Nepomucene and St. Anthony of Padua. After the damage caused by fire in 1811, the church was renovated thanks to the support of Elżbieta Izabela Lubomirska. The church was damaged again during World War I.

In the past (at least at the beginning of the 20th century), the church pulpit featured figural sculptures created by an artist from the Lviv school of Rococo sculpture, who remains unknown to this day.

== Buried persons ==
- Krzysztof Strzemeski was buried in a tomb near the high altar
- Jakub Ksawery Potocki

== Priests ==
- Stefan Stupnicki (born 1781, died 2 November 1836)
- Jan Tepper (born 1806, died 3 October 1866)

== See also ==
- Saint Nicholas Church, Berezhany

== Bibliography ==
- X. Bolesław Limanowski: Parafia rzym. katol. w Brzeżanach w r. 1930. [W:] Brzeżany 1530-1930. Złoczów : J. Landesberg, 1930, s. 34–35.
- Maurycy Maciszewski: Brzeżany w czasach Rzeczypospolitej Polskiej. Brody, 1910, s. 101–112.
