= Saint Nicholas Church, Berezhany =

Ukrainian church in Berezhany, Ukraine

Saint Nicholas Church
- Церква Святого Миколая
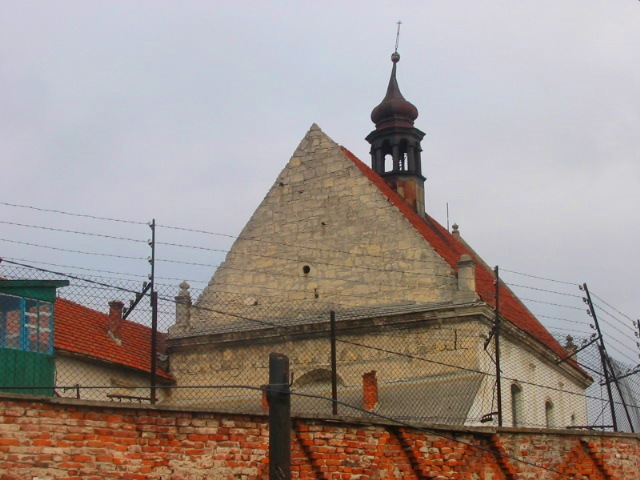

- Location within Ternopil Oblast

Location
- Location: Berezhany
- Coordinates: 49°26′54.0″N 24°56′10.6″E

Immovable Monument of National Significance of Ukraine
- Official name: Костел бернардинів з келіями (мур.) (Bernardine Church and cells (stone))
- Type: Architecture
- Reference no.: 190034

Saint Nicholas Church and Bernardine Monastery (Ukrainian: Церква Святого Миколая) is a historic complex in Berezhany, Ternopil Oblast, and an architectural monument of national significance. Founded by the Sieniawski family, owners of the city.

== History ==
Around 1630, Urszula Zofia Sieniawska, née Krotoska (d. 1637), began construction of the church, but due to the Cossack wars and the enemy's seizure of the Sieniawski family's estates in Podolia and Ukraine, she was unable to complete the work. In 1683, the then owner of the town, the Voivode of Volhynia and Crown Field Hetman Mikołaj Hieronim Sieniawski, together with his wife Cecylia Maria Radziwiłł, undertook the foundation, committing themselves to complete the construction of the church of St. Nicholas and to build a monastery for the Bernardines next to it. As the founder died in 1684, his son Adam Mikołaj Sieniawski continued the construction in accordance with his will. The construction of the temple was completed in 1716, and on 4 March 1720, the Metropolitan Archbishop of Lviv, Jan Skarbek, consecrated the church of St. Nicholas.

When Adam Mikołaj, the last male representative of the Sieniawski family, died in 1726, his only daughter, Maria Zofia, brought the estate inherited from her father as a dowry to her second husband, August Aleksander Czartoryski, and so the Brzeżany estate of the Sieniawski family passed into the hands of the Czartoryski princes, and later to the Potocki family of the Pilawa coat of arms. These families continued to look after the Bernardine monastery in Berezhany.

The church contained beautiful carved statues of saints, possibly created by Johann Georg Pinsel. According to Andrzej Betlej, it is difficult to associate any element of the sculptural decoration in the church with Jan Obrocki, as suggested by Zbigniew Hornung.

== See also ==
- Saints Peter and Paul church, Berezhany

== Bibliography ==
- Aleksander Krzysztof Sitnik OFM. Inwentarze klasztoru i kościoła klasztornego bernardynów w Brzeżanach z lat 1781–1848. „Hereditas Monasteriorum”, vol. 5, 2014, s. 383–414
- Maurycy Maciszewski: Brzeżany w czasach Rzeczypospolitej Polskiej. Brody, 1910, s. 112–114.
