= Holy Trinity Church, Berezhany =

Ukrainian church in Berezhany, Ukraine

Holy Trinity Church
- Церква Пресвятої Трійці
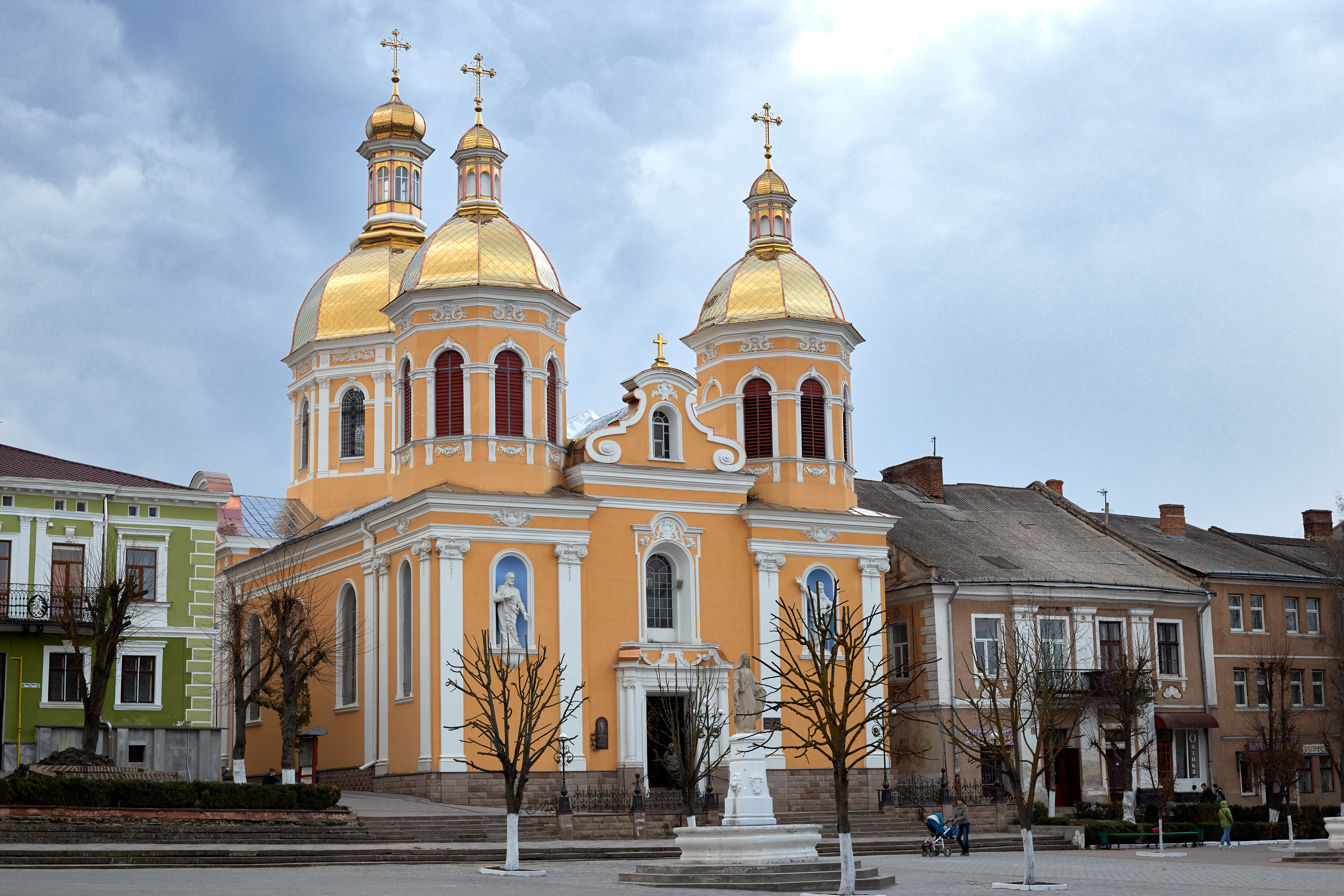

- Location within Ternopil Oblast
- 49°26′14.37″N 24°56′14.09″E
- Location: Berezhany
- Country: Ukraine
- Denomination: Catholic Church
- Sui iuris church: Ukrainian Greek Catholic Church
- Tradition: Byzantine Rite

History
- Dedication: Trinity

Architecture
- Completed: 1768 (current building)

Administration
- Archdiocese: Ternopil–Zboriv

Holy Trinity Church (Ukrainian: Церква Пресвятої Трійці) is a historic Christian church, a Greek Catholic church in Berezhany, Ternopil Oblast, and an architectural monument of national importance. It is located on the local market square. The current church dates back to the turn of the 19th and 20th centuries, when it was rebuilt between 1893 and 1903 on the initiative of priest Teofil Korduba, the parish priest at the time.

== History, description ==
The Holy Trinity Church in Berezhany was first mentioned in municipal records in 1626, when a brick church began to be built on the site of a wooden church.

The church was built in the second half of the 18th century as a result of the reconstruction of former warehouses belonging to Armenian merchants. The temple was founded by Prince August Aleksander Czartoryski, the second husband of Maria Zofia Czartoryska, the last of the Sieniawski family, who owned Berezhany for many years. The founder also donated relics to the church (they had previously belonged to one of the owners of the town, Crown Field Hetman Mikołaj Hieronim Sieniawski, who carried them in a field altar on his military expeditions) – the hand of St. John the Baptist in a gilded coffin. The church was then rebuilt twice more in the 19th century. The current temple dates back to the turn of the 19th and 20th centuries, when it was rebuilt in 1893–1903 on the initiative of the then parish priest, Teofil Korduba (among others, the father-in-law of Osyp Makovei).

The church still has its original entrance door with images of Cyril and Methodius and a lock decorated with the Sieniawski (Leliwa) coat of arms. The painting of the Holy Virgin of Rome, which Alexander Sieniawski brought to Brzeżany from Rome in the 17th century, was moved here from the castle chapel.

== Bibliography ==
- Brzeżany. (Śruba konkurencyjna). „Kurjer Lwowski”. 140, s. 2, 26 maja 1906.
- Tychyj, Bohdan (July 2013). "Tryczi woskresła cerkwa Preswiatoji Trijci". Pam'jatky Ukrajiny (in Ukrainian). 2 (191, specjalny). Kijów: 34–39.
