= Berezhany =

City in Ternopil Oblast, Ukraine

Berezhany Бережани
- City
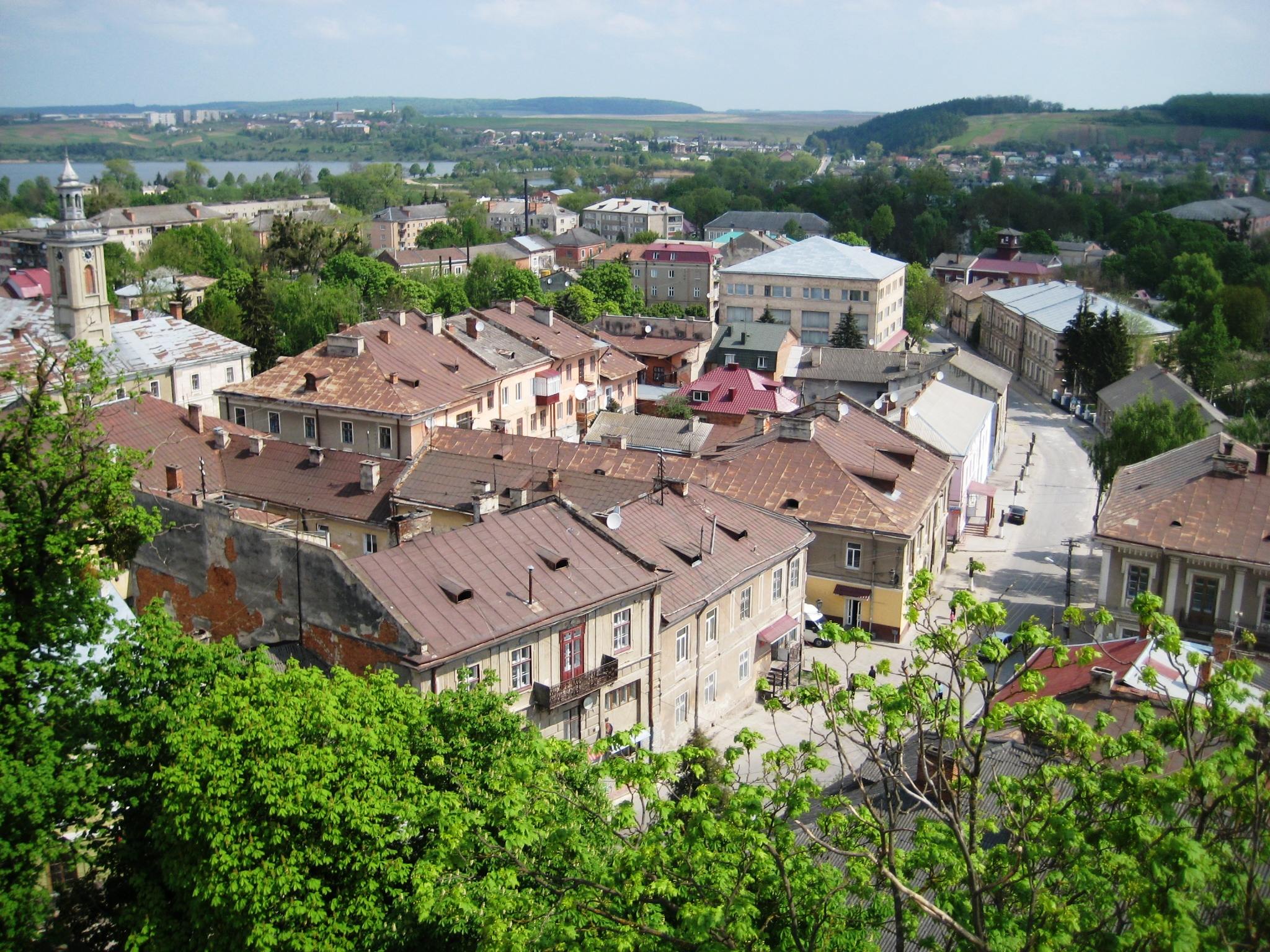
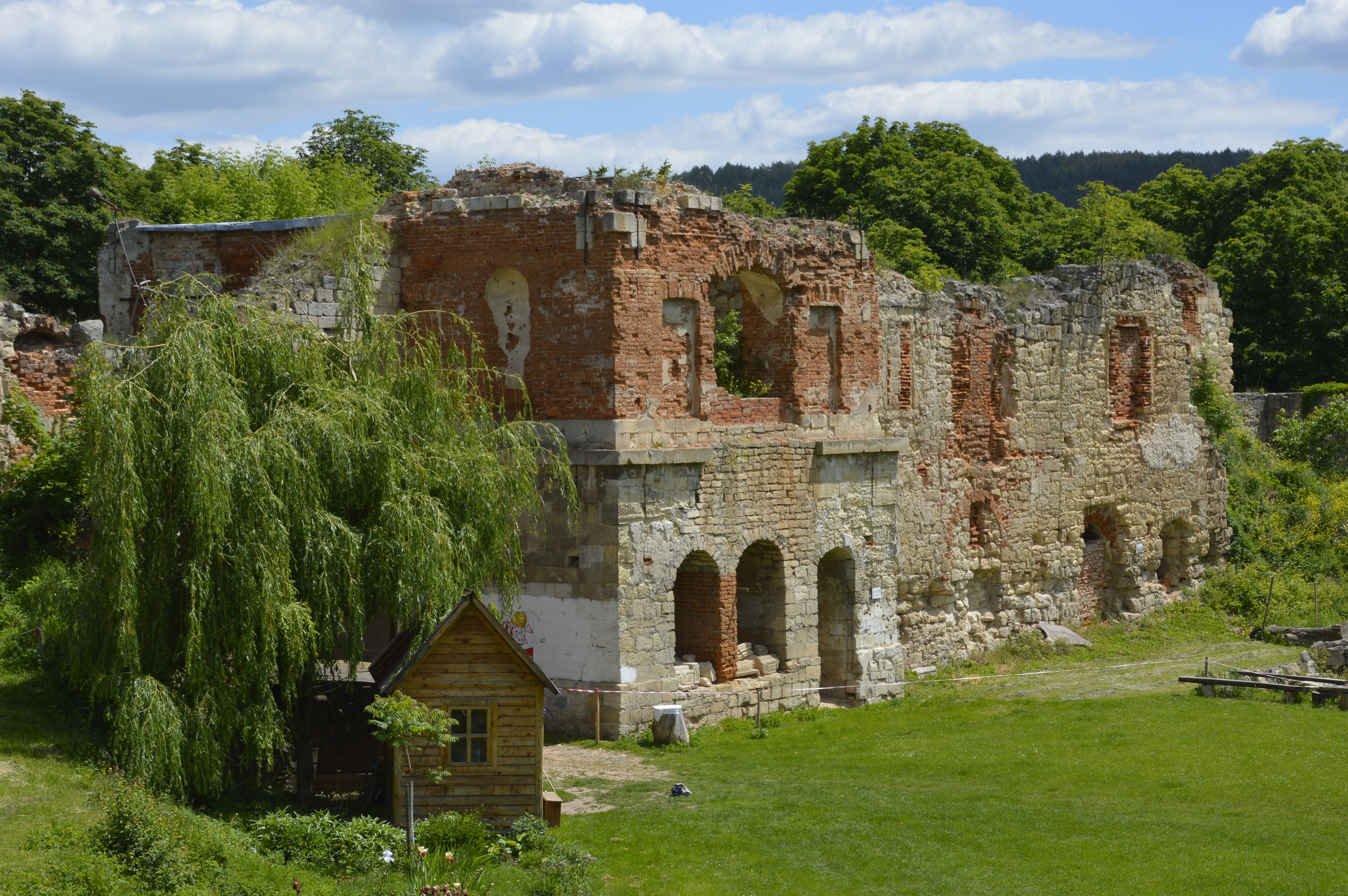
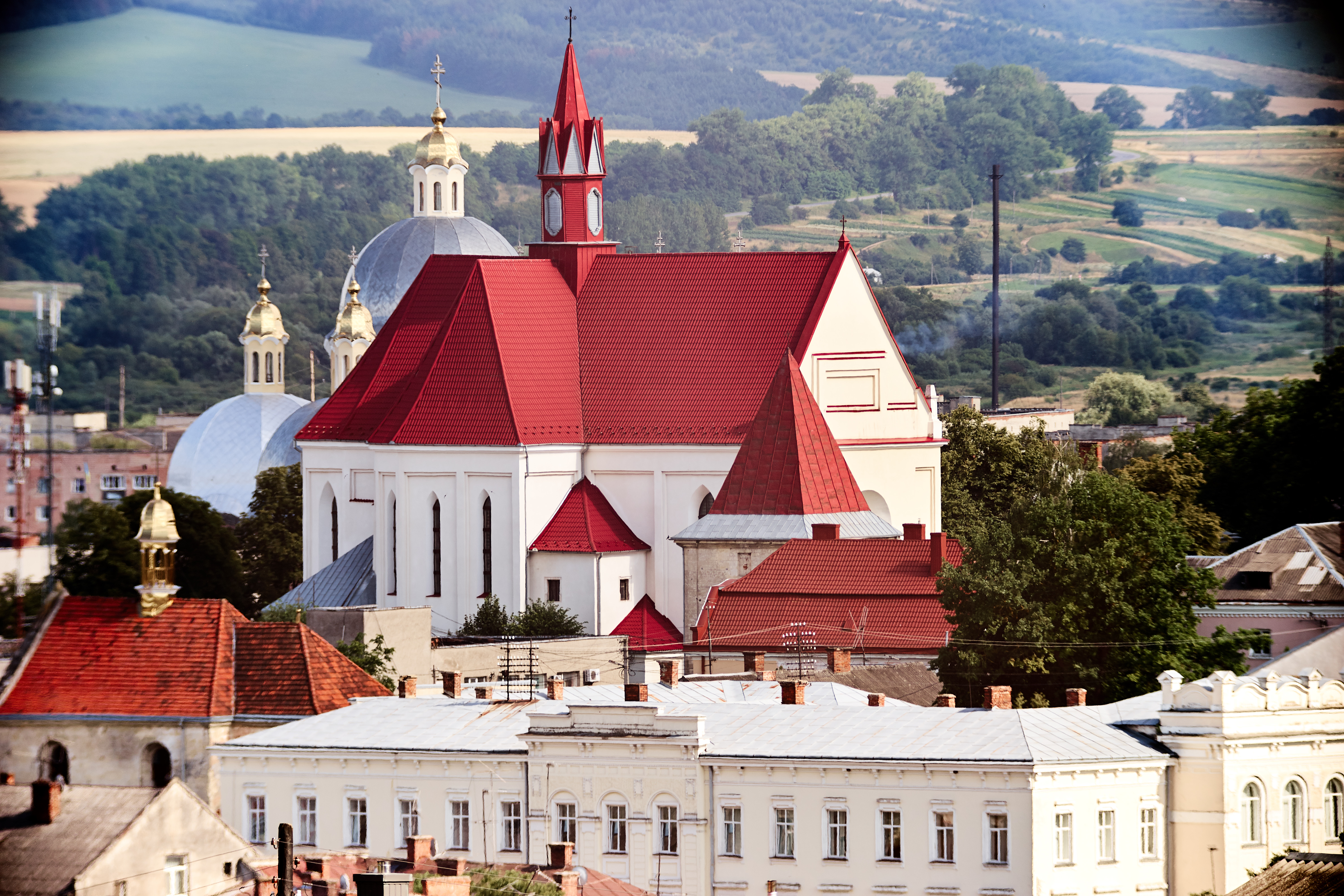
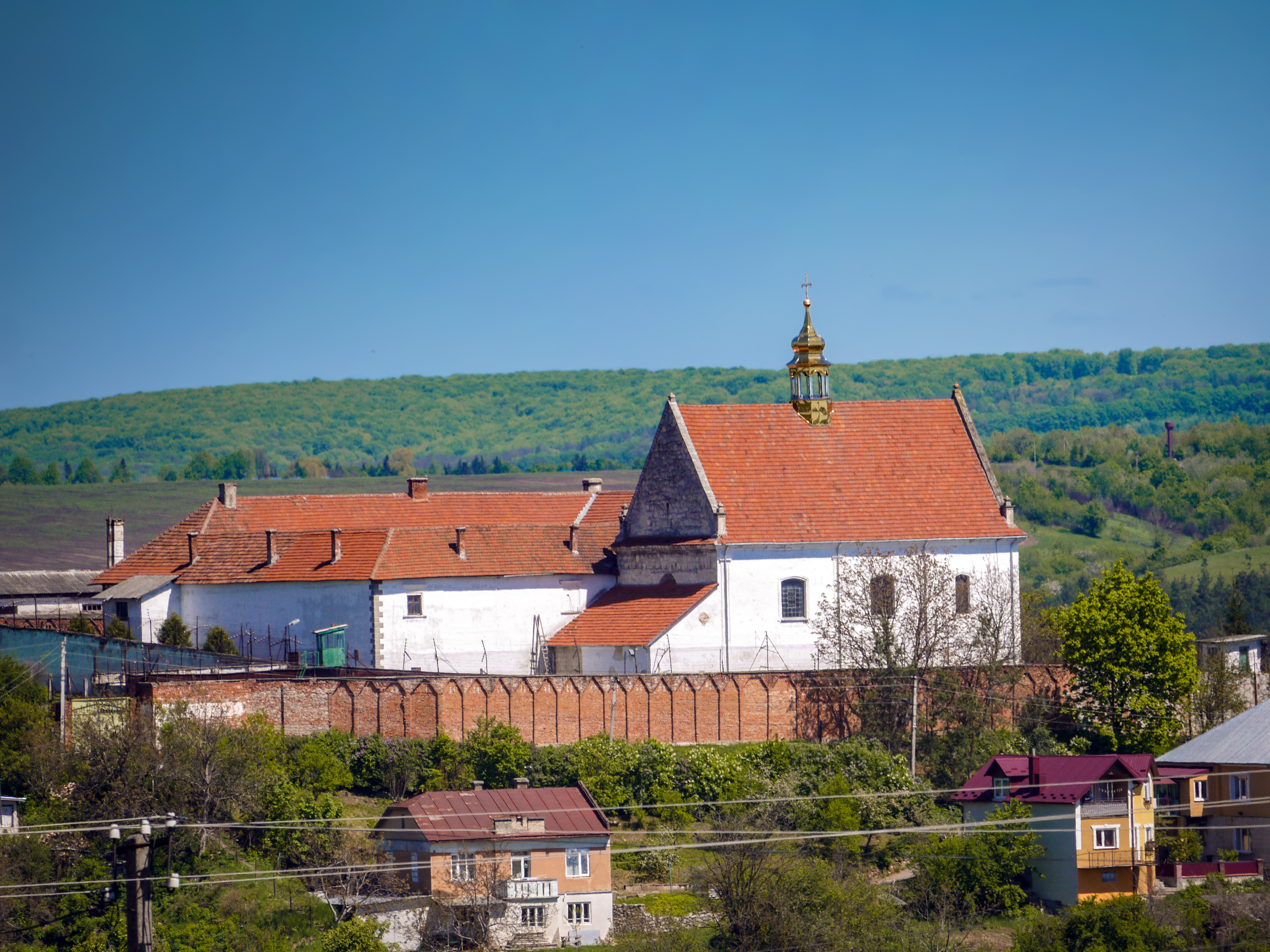
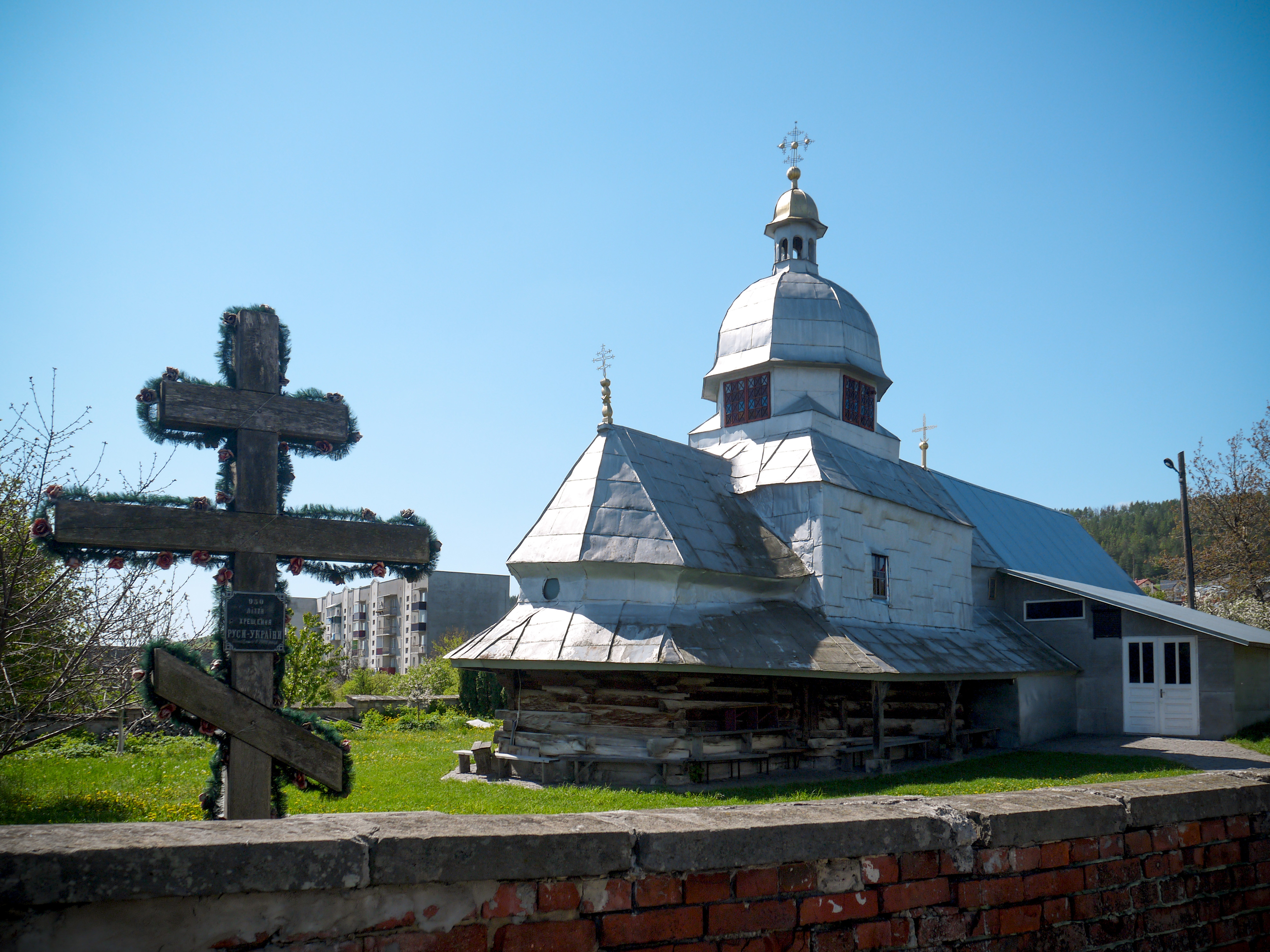
- Panorama of the old town; Ruins of Berezhany Castle; Church of St. Peter and Paul; Bernardine Monastery; Saint Nicholas Church

- Flag Coat of arms
- Interactive map of Berezhany
- Location of Berezhany without Ukraine Berezhany (Ukraine)
- Coordinates: 49°26′45″N 24°56′10″E
- Country: Ukraine
- Oblast: Ternopil Oblast
- Raion: Ternopil Raion
- Hromada: Berezhany urban hromada
- First mentioned: 1375
- City rights: 1530

Government
  - Mayor: Rostyslav Bortnyk

Area
  - Total: 12 km^{2} (4.6 sq mi)

Population (2022)
  - Total: 17,139
  - Density: 1,400/km^{2} (3,700/sq mi)
- Postal code: 47505
- Area code: + 380-3548
- Website: Berezhany City Council

Berezhany (Ukrainian: Бережани [bereˈʒɑnɪ]; Polish: Brzeżany; Yiddish: ברעזשאַן, romanized: Brezhan) is a small city on the Zolota Lypa river, administratively subjected to the Ternopil Raion of Ternopil Oblast in the historical region of Galician Podolia in Ukraine. It lies about 50 km (31 mi) from the administrative center of the oblast, Ternopil. Berezhany hosts the administration of Berezhany urban hromada, one of the hromadas of Ukraine. Population: 17,139 (2022 estimate).

== History ==
=== Middle Ages ===
The first written mention of Berezhany dates from 1375, when the village which was then part of the Kingdom of Poland, was granted by the Governor of Galicia and Lodomeria Vladislaus II to Ruthenian boyar Vas'ko Teptukhovych. In 1416 the ownership was confirmed by Polish king Władysław II Jagiełło, however it is unknown if the village mentioned in the document was located on the same site as the modern city. The first certain mention of Berezhany in documents comes from the 1469 lustration of the royal domain of Ruthenian Voivodeship. In 1510 the village was ruined by Vlachs, and in 1512 and 1515 was devastated by Tatars.

Under the rule of Poland Berezhany was the property of a noble family from Buchach — members House of Buczacki, later Sieniawa. As Mikołaj Sieniawski, a notable Polish military commander and politician envisioned a seat of his family there, on March 19, 1530, King Sigismund I of Poland granted the village a city charter modelled on the Magdeburg Law. The document, among other privileges, granted the new town of Brzeżany, as it is called in Polish, with two markets, one for the day of Our Lord's Ascension and the other for the day of Saint Peter in Chains, that were to be held every year. As to weekly fairs, these were to be held every Friday, although with respect to the rights of other nearby towns. Thus, the town was to allow each and every tradesperson, cart driver or businessman, regardless of his or her state, gender, faith or rite, to arrive to the town of Brzeżany for trade.

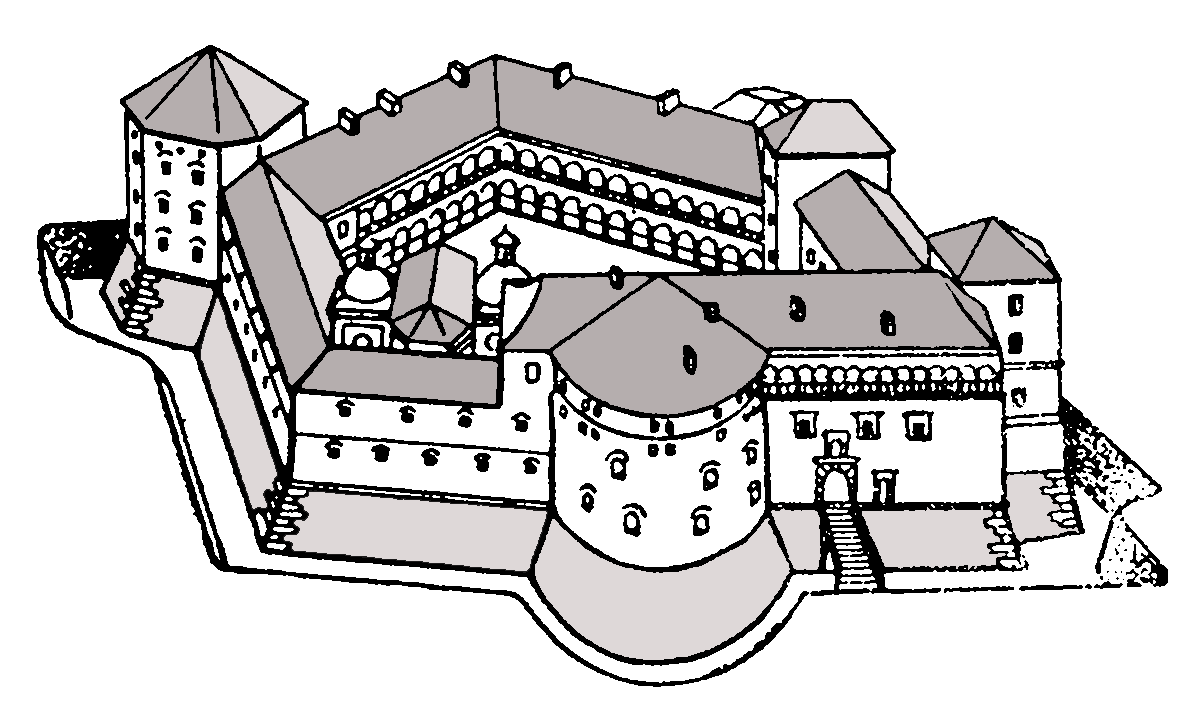
Reconstruction of Berezhany fortress.

The town's location on the route between Lviv and Terebovlia proved beneficial to the city's growth and development. Among the first settlers to inhabit the town were people from Lwów liberated by Sieniawski from Tatar captivity. It soon started to attract settlers from all over Poland, including a large number of Jews, Ukrainians and Armenians. In 1534 Mikołaj Sieniawski also started to construct a large fortress at a steep hill on a small island at the Złota Lipa river (see Berezhany Castle). The stronghold was finished in 1554 and became the main seat of the Sieniawski family and one of the best fortified places in the region. Simultaneously, a large fortified convent and a church of the Bernardines was constructed on the hill nearby. Both fortified places provided a safe refuge for the tradesmen, which added to the city's prominence in trade and commerce.

=== Early modern era ===
During the 16th century Berezhany had its own mill and a church. In the 1560s the New Town was established with a market square. In 1570 owership over Berezhany was divided between the two of Sieniawski's sons. In 1584 a new suburb called Adamów (later Adamivka) was established on the route cooencting Berezhany and Pidhaitsi. By the end of the 16th century each of the three settlements composing the city had its own church. In 1603 an Orthodox brotherhood was established in Adamivka with the permission by Lviv bishop Gedeon Balaban. In the early 17th century one of Mikołaj Sieniawski's grandsons, also named Mikołaj, fortified the city itself. The fortress withstood all attacks until the Khmelnytsky Uprising. However, during the Siege of Zbarazh in 1649 Berezhany was raided by Tatars and Cossacks, who burned 50 houses, plundered the city's churches and took many captives. In 1655 during The Deluge, Berezhany was captured by Swedish forces and once again plundered. The city was rebuilt afterwards and withstood Cossack attacks in 1667 and 1672.

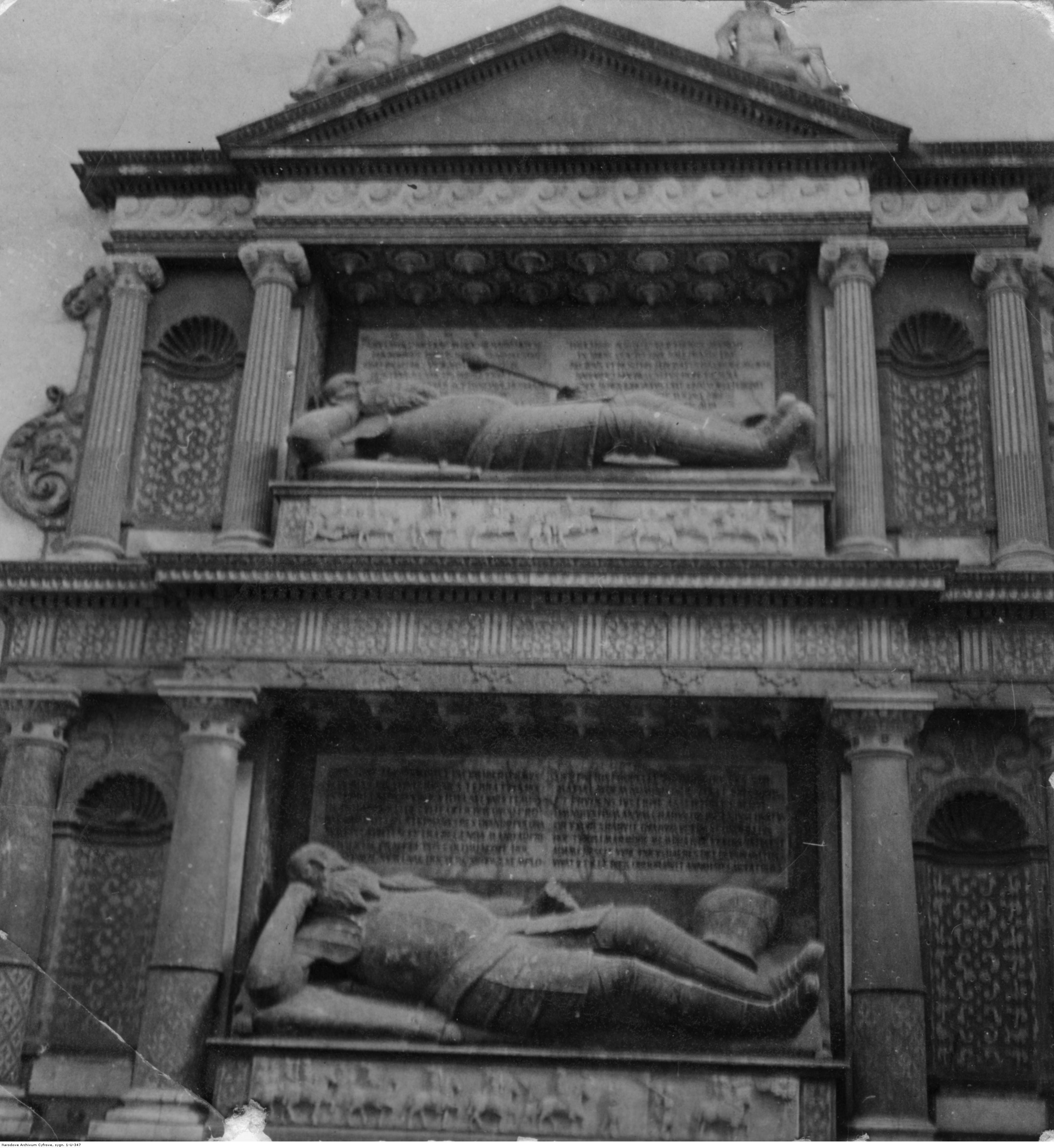
Historical photo of the graves of Mikołaj and Hieronim Sieniawski in Berezhany Castle, now destroyed

According to a travel report from 1670, Berezhany had three Catholic and four Uniate churches, two of them wooden; in the absence of a city hall, court affairs took place in the local hospital; a trade fair was held on the city market every Monday; most of the buildings were made of wood; around one-fifth of the city's population, which counted 500 families, was Jewish. In 1675 the town was again sacked and pillaged by the forces of the Ottoman Empire. However, Mikołaj Hieronim Sieniawski financed the reconstruction of the town. Among the buildings rebuilt were the Bernardine church and a Uniate church in the suburb of Polska Adamówka (paradoxically being primarily inhabited by Ukrainians and not Poles as the name suggests). Because of its relative safety the town grew and by the end of the 17th century there were nearly 8,000 inhabitants there.

In 1703, Brzeżany was the place of a meeting between Tamás Esze, leader of an anti-Habsburg uprising in Hungary, and Francis II Rákóczi and Miklós Bercsényi, Hungarian conspirators who fled Austrian persecution to Poland. In the town, Rákóczi and Bercsényi signed a proclamation, which called on Hungarians to fight for independence, and then they both joined the uprising in Hungary.

After the death of Adam Mikołaj Sieniawski, the last of his kin, the town was inherited by August Aleksander Czartoryski through Sieniawski's daughter Maria Zofia. Czartoryski, a notable magnate, created a large artificial lake in the town's proximity in the early 18th century. Along the bank of that lake, the suburbs of Siółko and Kastelówka were built. Following the collapse of the old church, in 1761 the Holy Trinity Church was rebuilt on the new place at the expense of August Aleksander Czartoryski and his daughter Elżbieta Izabela Lubomirska.

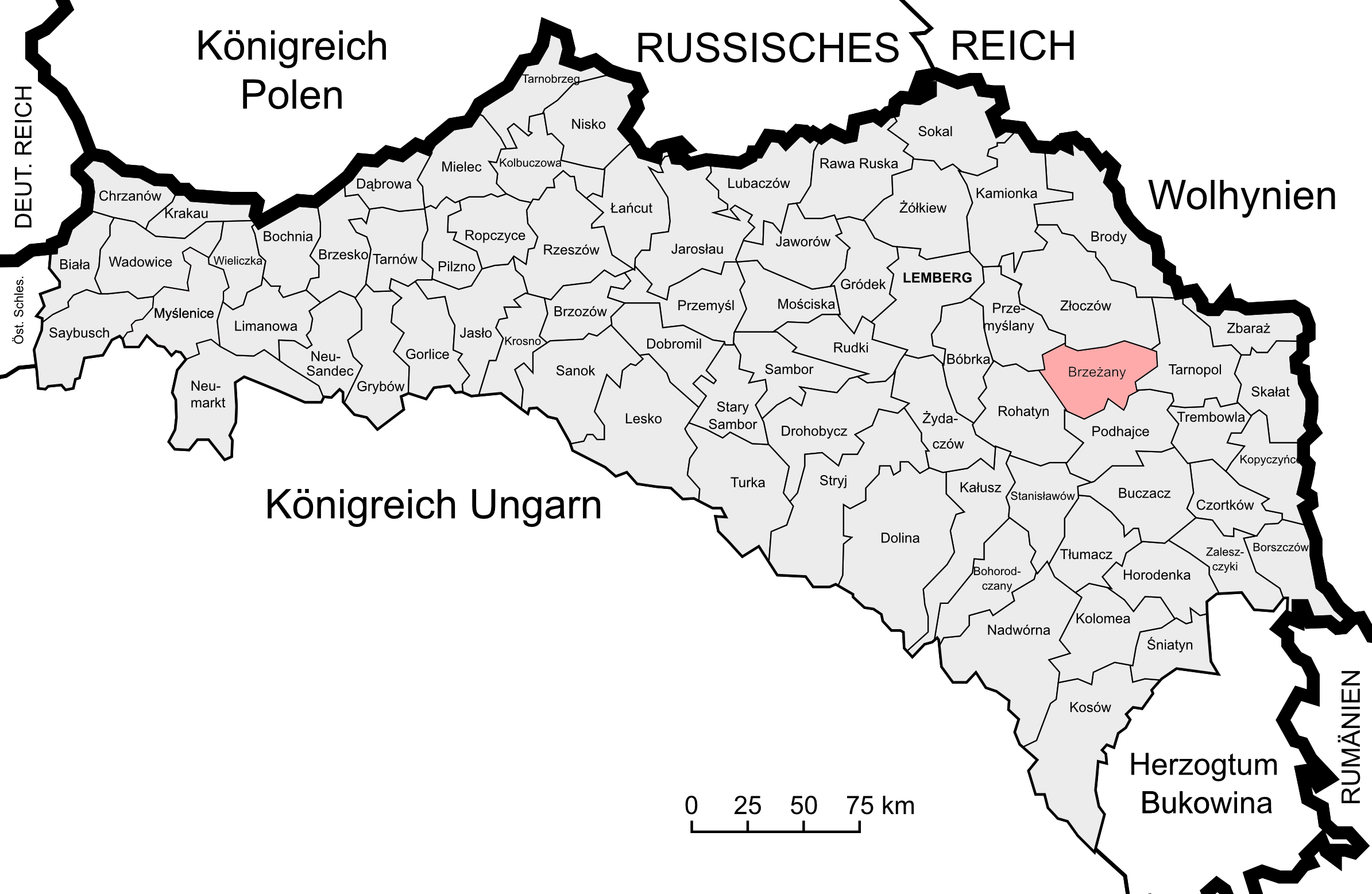
Location of Bezirk Brzezany (Berezhany District) in the Austrian crown land of Galicia

After the First Partition of Poland of 1772 the town was annexed by Austria, who attached it to the region of Galicia. In 1781 Berezhany became a district centre of the Kingdom of Galicia and Lodomeria. A grammar school was founded there in 1805, and had many notable alumni, including Włodzimierz Bednarski, Franz Kokovsky, Bohdan Lepkyi, Rudolf Moch, Kornel Ujejski, Ruslan Shashkevych, and the future Marshal of Poland Edward Rydz-Śmigły. During the Revolutions of 1848 in the Austrian Empire, a branch of the Supreme Ruthenian Council functioned in the city along with a national guard, which were opposed to their Polish counterparts created during the same time. According to a government decree from the same year, teaching of Ukrainian language was allowed in the local gymnasium. After 1867 the town became part of the Austro-Hungarian Empire and continued to flourish as it was outside of the region of fortifications, inside which construction of new houses was severely limited. The town was connected by rail to Tarnopol in 1894 and in 1900 it had a population of 10,610. Between 1899 and 1901 the Holy Trinity Church was reconstructed with the funds of local Ukrainian community.

=== Early 20th century ===
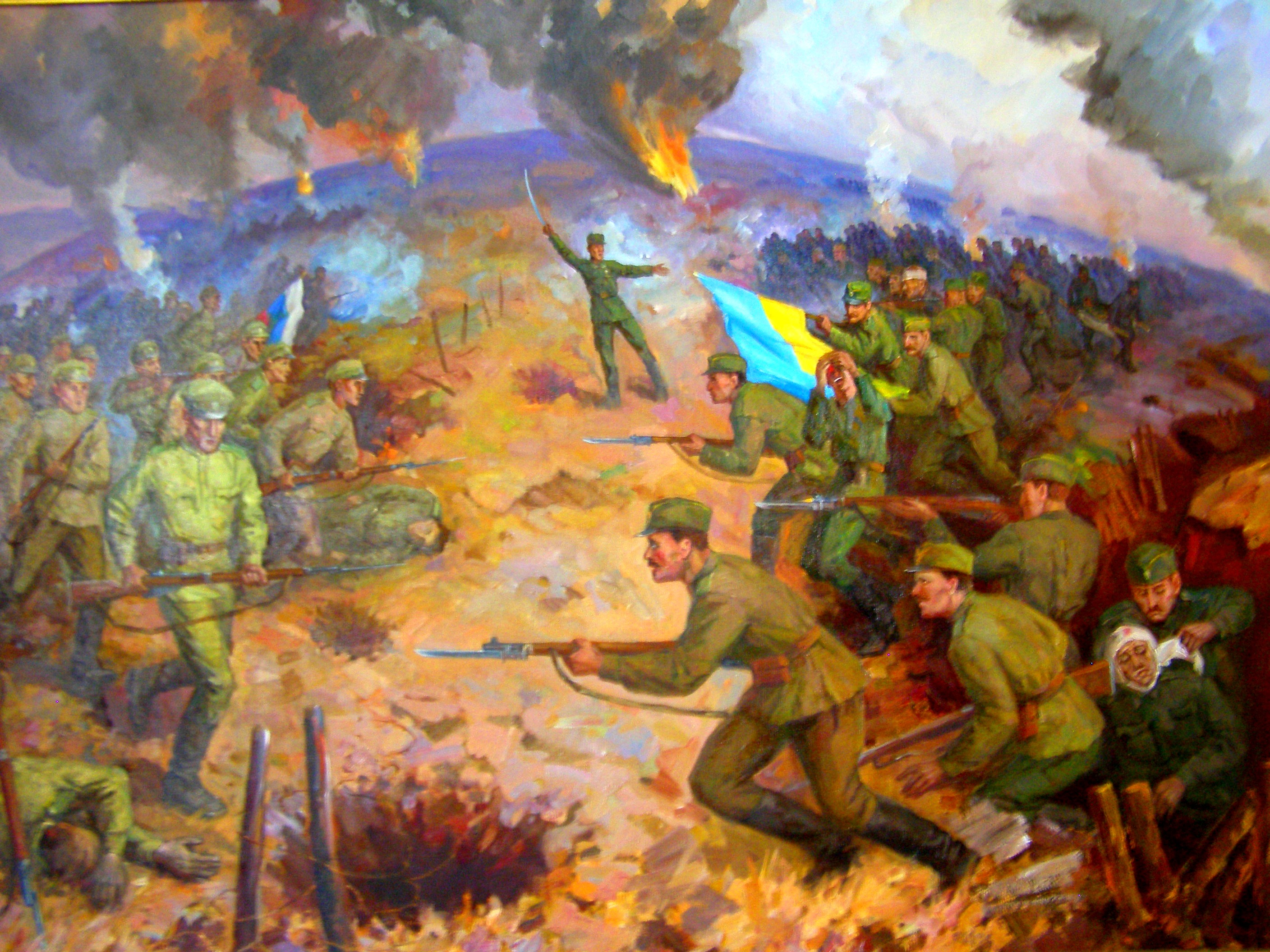
Ukrainian Sich Riflemen fighting against Russian troops at Lysonia hill near Berezhany

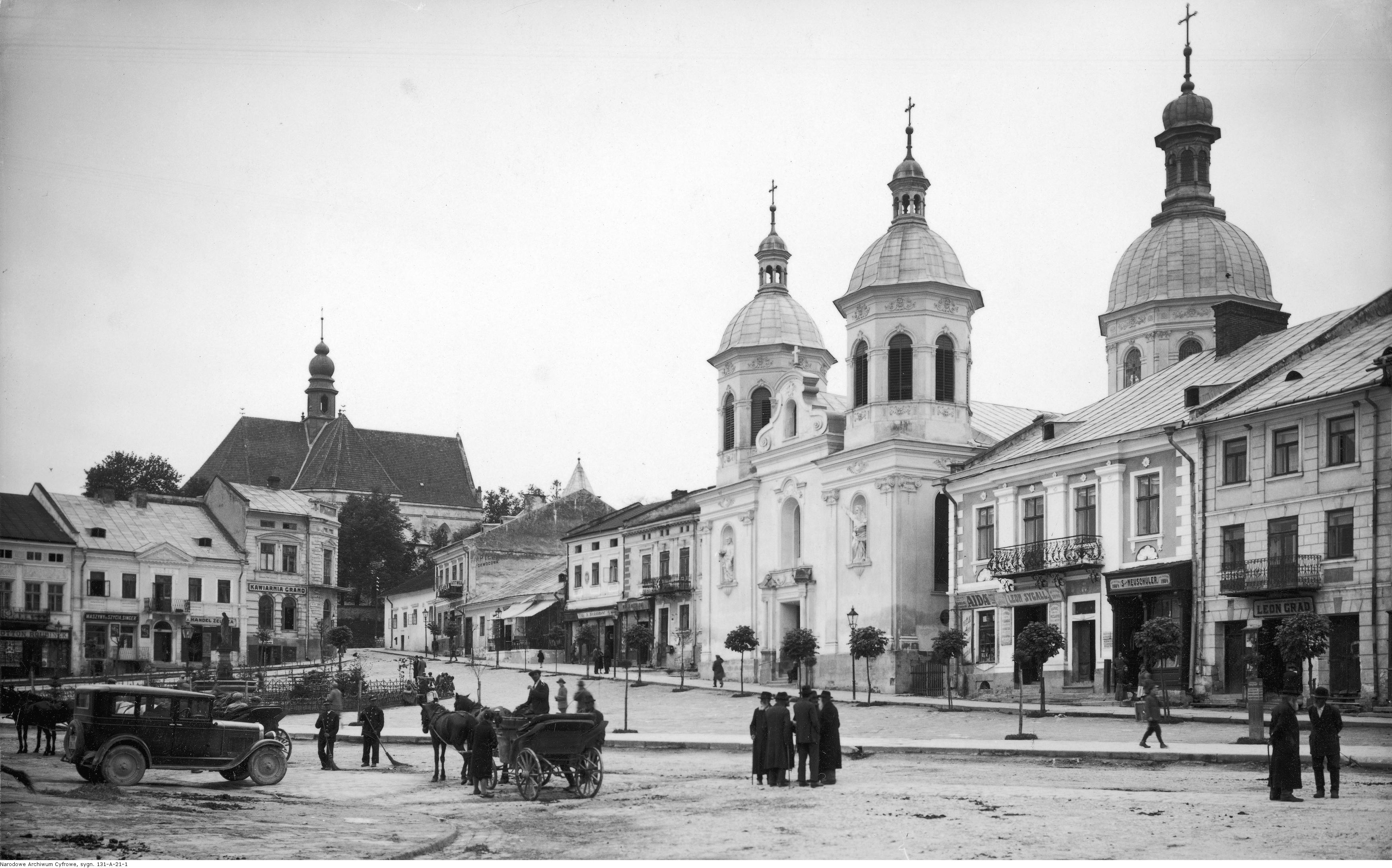
Brzeżany in 1929

Although the city remained quite populous, with time it lost much of its importance as a trade centre. Also, the castle fell into neglect as the successors of the Sieniawski family, the Czartoryski and Lubomirski families, were owners of many more castles and had no interest in this one in particular. During World War I the town was briefly occupied by Russia, but was soon recaptured by Austria-Hungary. The castle was partially pillaged by Austro-Hungarian soldiers who were stationed there during the war while some of the works of art were evacuated from the palaces of Puławy, Łańcut and Wilanów. Between 1915 and 1916 the hill of Lysonia in the vicinity of Berezhany was the site of several battles involving the Ukrainian Sich Riflemen.

After the end of the war the town was part of the short-lived West Ukrainian People's Republic, but in 1919 was awarded to the renascent Poland by the Conference of Ambassadors of the League of Nations following the short Polish-Ukrainian War. During the Polish-Bolshevik War it was briefly occupied by the Red Army, but was soon recaptured by the Polish Army after the Battle of Warsaw. However, some of the most precious sculptures and paintings from the castle and local churches, evacuated to Kraków, were never returned and instead survived the war in the castle of Pieskowa Skała near Ojców. According to the 1921 census, the town had a population of 10,083, 62,0% Polish, 22.4% Jewish and 15,5% Ukrainian. By 1931 the population had risen to 12,000.

=== World War II ===
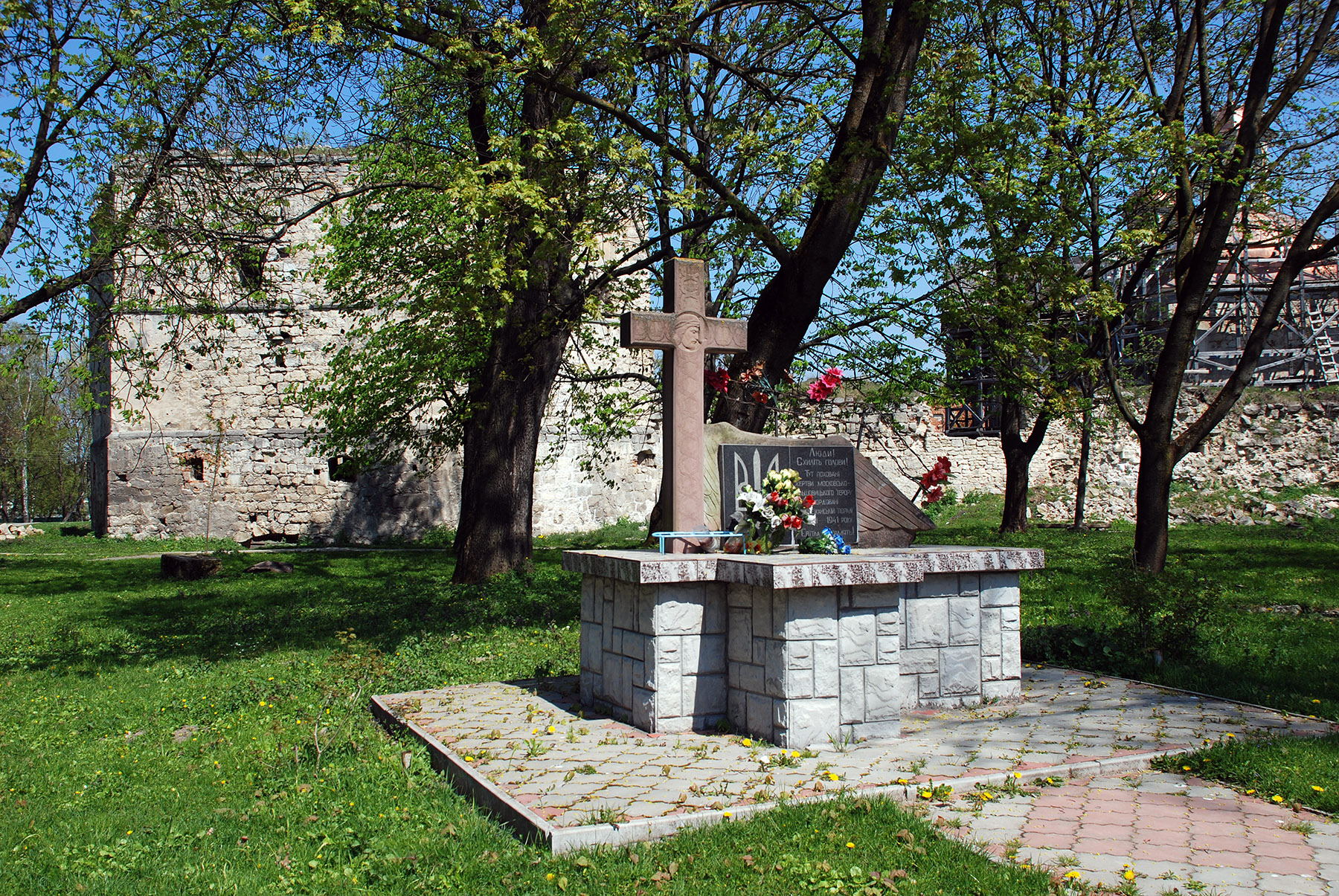
Mass grave of the victims of the NKVD prisoner massacre in Berezhany

After the Invasion of Poland of 1939 and the outbreak of World War II the town was briefly occupied by Nazi Germany, after which it was transferred to the Soviet Union. During the Soviet occupation many of the local inhabitants were sent to the Gulag camps; there was also a notable NKVD prison located in the town. In June 1941, at the onset of Operation Barbarossa, NKVD massacred from 174 to 300 prisoners held in Berezhany prison.

On July 4, 1941, the town was again occupied by Germany and latter attached to the so-called Distrikt Galizien of the General Government. Following German occupation, a Ukrainian local administration was established according to a decree of the Ukrainian national government. Before World War II Brzezany's Jewish population had been about 4,000, while after 1939 this population tripled with an additional 8,000 Jews who came refugees from German-occupied territories. After the Soviets left in July 1941, enraged by the discovery of the bodies from the prison massacre, local Ukrainians launched a pogrom, resulting in the murder of dozens of the town's Jews, as well as looting and injuries inflicted upon them. In December 1941, approximately 1,000 Jews were killed in the Lityatyn forest. On 12 June 1943 the Nazis murdered almost all the Jews from the Brzezany ghetto and work camp at the local cemetery; only a few escaped. Between 1942 and the end of the war there was heavy partisan activity in the area, mostly by local branches of the Armia Krajowa.

In 1944 the town was liberated in the course of Operation Tempest of the insurgent Polish Home Army, but the Poles were soon pushed aside as the town was occupied by the Red Army. In 1945 it was annexed by the Soviet Union and attached to the Ukrainian SSR.

=== Postwar era ===
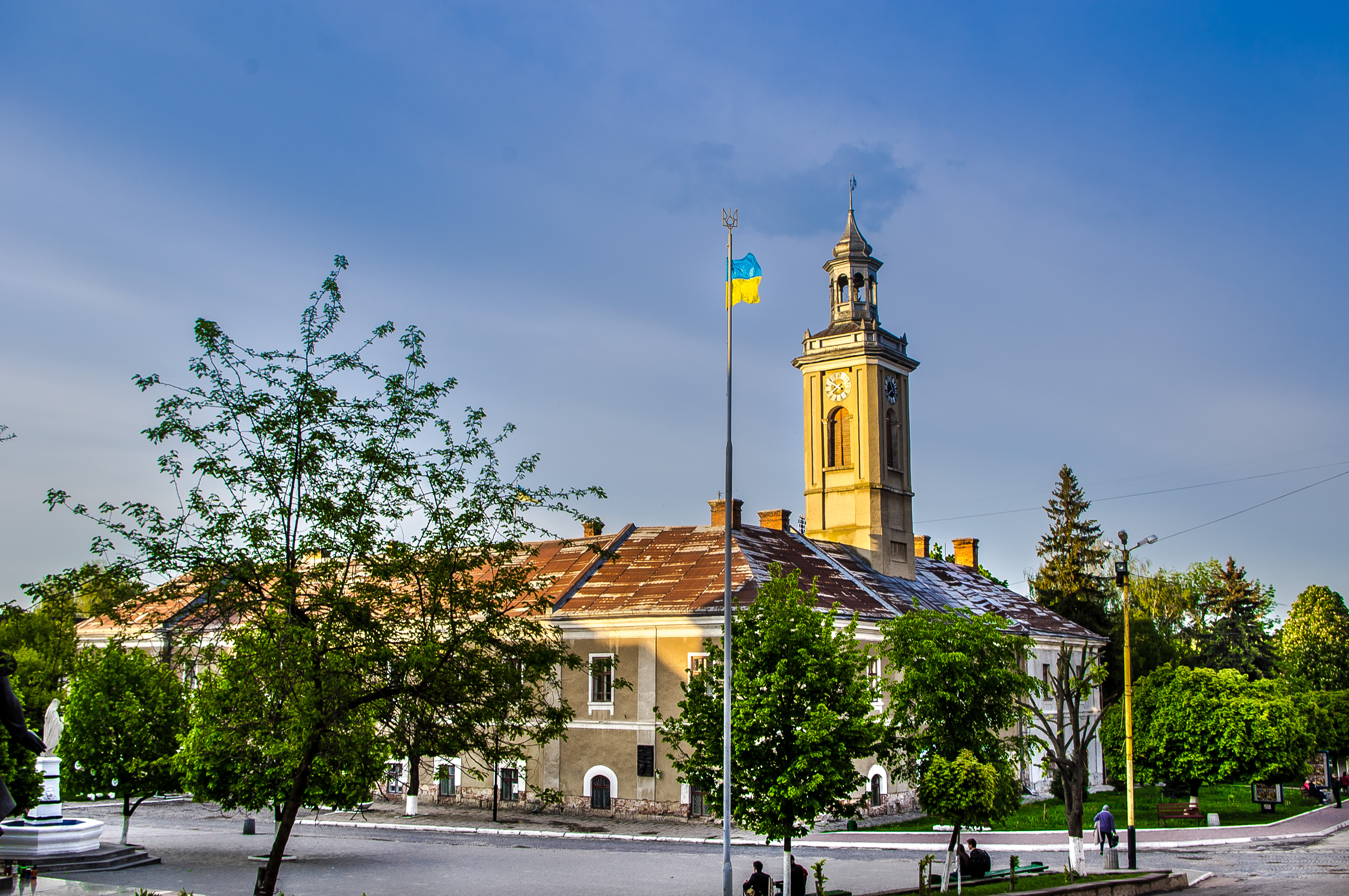
Flag of Ukraine in front of the city hall

According to the decision of the Soviet-organized Lviv pseudosynod, local parishes of the Ukrainian Greek Catholic Church were transferred under jurisdiction of the Russian Orthodox Church. In 1990 the Trinity Church was returned to the Greek Catholic community. Since 1991 Berezhany has been a part of independent Ukraine.

Until 18 July 2020, Berezhany was designated as a city of oblast significance and served as the administrative center of Berezhany Raion though it did not belong to the raion. As part of the administrative reform of Ukraine, which reduced the number of raions of Ternopil Oblast to three, the city was merged into Ternopil Raion.

== Geography ==
The city is located about 50 km (31 mi) from the administrative center of the oblast, Ternopil. The city is about 400 metres (1,300 ft) above sea level.

=== Climate ===
Climate data for Berezhany (1981–2010)
| Month | Jan | Feb | Mar | Apr | May | Jun | Jul | Aug | Sep | Oct | Nov | Dec | Year |
|---|---|---|---|---|---|---|---|---|---|---|---|---|---|
| Mean daily maximum °C (°F) | −0.1 (31.8) | 1.4 (34.5) | 6.2 (43.2) | 13.8 (56.8) | 19.8 (67.6) | 22.3 (72.1) | 24.3 (75.7) | 23.9 (75.0) | 18.7 (65.7) | 13.1 (55.6) | 5.9 (42.6) | 0.8 (33.4) | 12.5 (54.5) |
| Daily mean °C (°F) | −3.1 (26.4) | −2.1 (28.2) | 2.0 (35.6) | 8.5 (47.3) | 14.0 (57.2) | 16.8 (62.2) | 18.7 (65.7) | 17.9 (64.2) | 13.3 (55.9) | 8.2 (46.8) | 2.6 (36.7) | −1.9 (28.6) | 7.9 (46.2) |
| Mean daily minimum °C (°F) | −6.0 (21.2) | −5.2 (22.6) | −1.6 (29.1) | 3.7 (38.7) | 8.5 (47.3) | 11.7 (53.1) | 13.5 (56.3) | 12.8 (55.0) | 8.7 (47.7) | 4.2 (39.6) | −0.3 (31.5) | −4.6 (23.7) | 3.8 (38.8) |
| Average precipitation mm (inches) | 30.0 (1.18) | 35.3 (1.39) | 37.3 (1.47) | 42.2 (1.66) | 67.9 (2.67) | 80.5 (3.17) | 80.8 (3.18) | 71.7 (2.82) | 54.1 (2.13) | 41.9 (1.65) | 36.0 (1.42) | 37.5 (1.48) | 615.4 (24.23) |
| Average precipitation days (≥ 1.0 mm) | 8.9 | 8.8 | 8.2 | 7.7 | 10.1 | 10.7 | 9.9 | 9.1 | 8.4 | 7.1 | 8.7 | 9.5 | 107.1 |
| Average relative humidity (%) | 84.7 | 83.4 | 79.4 | 73.0 | 73.0 | 75.4 | 76.3 | 77.6 | 80.7 | 82.1 | 85.8 | 86.8 | 79.9 |
Source: World Meteorological Organization

== Education ==
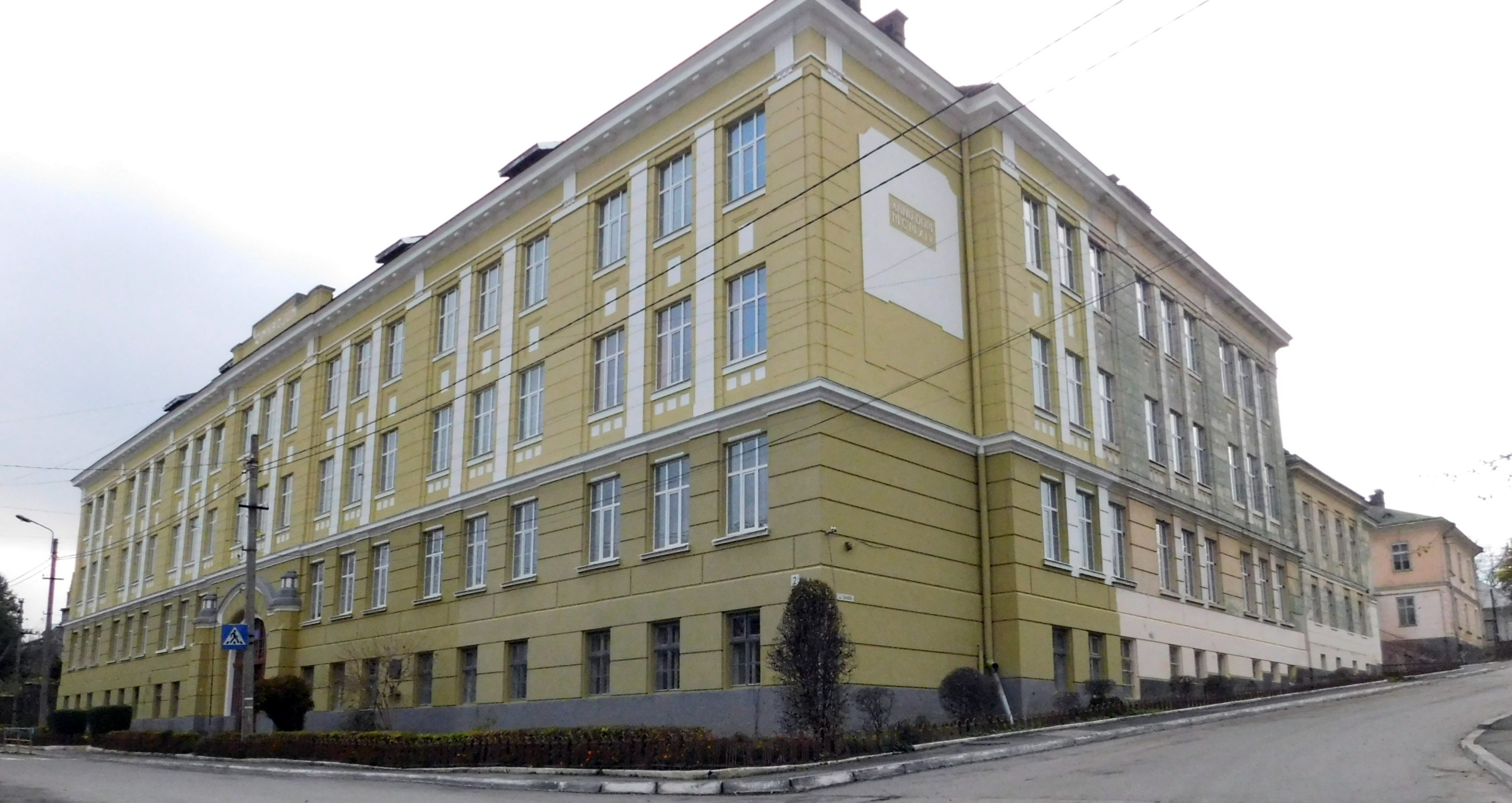
Berezhany Gymnazium

In 1789 a German gymnasium was established in Berezhany. Polish and Ukrainian-language classes were opened in the establishment in 1874 and 1905 respectively. The gymnasium played an important role in the Ukrainian national revival in Galicia, being connected with such figures as Oleksander Barvinskyi, Bohdan Lepkyi and Antin Krushelnytskyi. A secret Ukrainian patriotic circle was created by Zenon Kuzelia during his studies in the gymnasium in 1900.

Today there are four secondary schools and a grammar school in the city.

== Economy ==
Berezhany is a minor centre of construction industry. A brickyard, a furniture factory and a glassworks are all of economic importance to the city.

== Landmarks ==
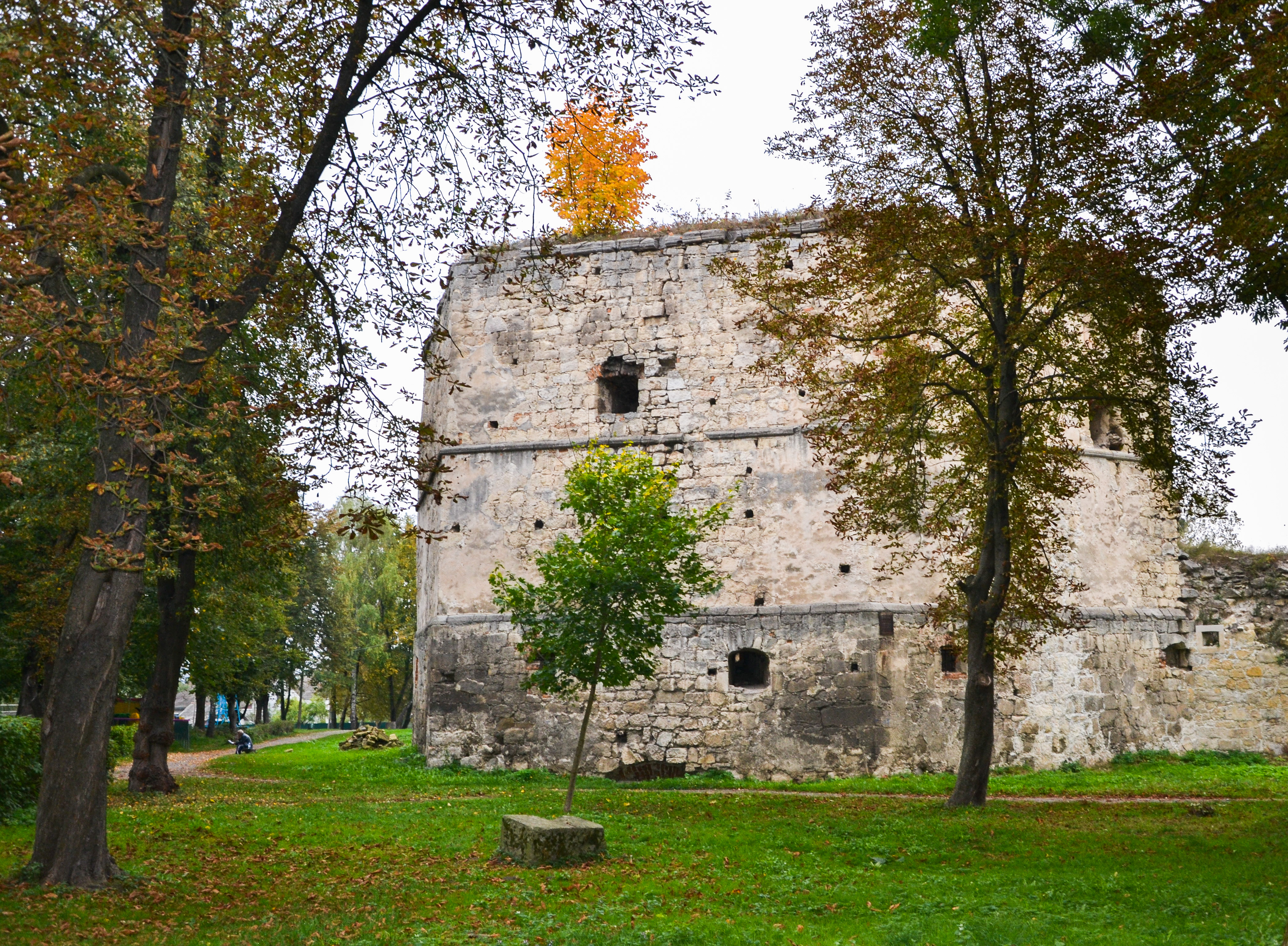
Berezhany Castle

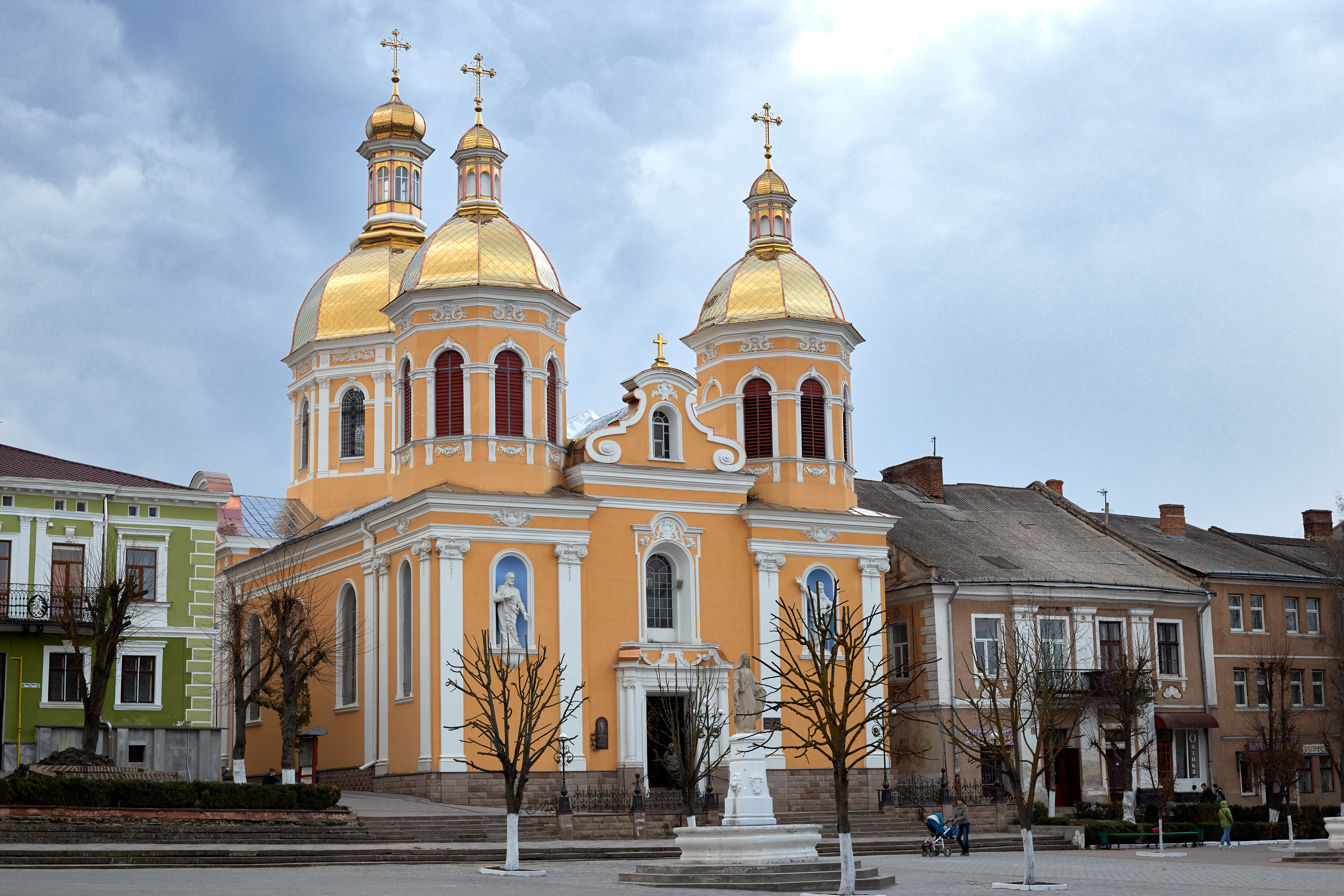
Trinity Church at Market Square

Of architectural significance are the ruins of the five-cornered fortress (completed in 1554), a park originally laid out in the 17th century, and the wooden Church of Saint Nicholas (completed in 1691).

== Nearby localities ==
- Shybalyn – c. 5 km (3.1 mi)
- Narayiv – c. 14 km (8.7 mi)
- Kozova – c. 20 km (12 mi)
- Pidhaytsi – c. 25 km (16 mi)
- Rohatyn – c. 30 km (19 mi)
- Peremyshliany – 40 km (25 mi)
- Burshtyn – c.40 km (25 mi)
- Halych – c. 50 km (31 mi)
- Ternopil – c. 50 km (31 mi)
- Lviv – c. 90 km (56 mi)
- Ivano-Frankivsk – c. 60 km (37 mi)
- Zavaliv – c. 35 km (22 mi)
- Zboriv – c. 35 km (22 mi)

== Notable people ==
- Aleksander Brückner — Polish scholar of Slavic languages and literatures, born here
- Antoni Brzeżańczyk — Polish football manager
- Zbigniew Dunin-Wasowicz — Polish soldier
- David Meir Frisch — rabbi, posek and rabbinical authority, lived here
- Myroslava Gongadze - Ukrainian and American journalist, born here
- Mykhailo Hlibovytskyi (1818–1887) – Ukrainian Greek Catholic priest and public figure
- Vassily Ivanchuk — world-class chess player, lived here
- Mykola Konrad — Ukrainian Greek-Catholic saint, beatified by John Paul II in 2001, taught here
- Edward Kofler — mathematician
- Olena Kulchytska – Ukrainian painter
- Bohdan Lepky – Ukrainian poet
- Samuel Hirsch Margulies — rabbi of Florence and the principal (from 1899) of Italy's only rabbinical seminary, born here
- Joseph Saul Nathansohn — Polish rabbi, posek and rabbinical authority, born here
- Abraham A. Neuman (1890—1970) — rabbi, historian and president of Dropsie College
- Shimon Redlich — historian, born here
- Edward Rydz-Śmigły — Commander-in-Chief of Polish Armed Forces, born here (in the village of Lapshyn on the outskirts of Berezhany)
- Volodymyr Sawchak (1911–2007) — painter and activist who lived in Australia, born here
- Sholom Mordechai Schwadron — Jewish gaon lived and died here
- Markiyan Shashkevych (1811–1843) — Ukrainian poet, studied here
- Vitalii Shupliak — Ukrainian artist
- Vitalii Skakun — soldier who sacrificed himself in the 2022 Russian invasion of Ukraine by blowing up a bridge, born here
- Edward Sucharda — Polish chemist and engineer, born here
- Sydir Tverdokhlib (1886—1922) — Ukrainian poet and political activist.
