= Samuel van Straalen =

Dutch-born English Hebraist and librarian

- Born: 24 June 1845; Gouda, Holland
- Died: 8 December 1902 (aged 57); London, United Kingdom
- Occupation: Librarian
- Employer: British Museum

Samuel van Straalen (24 June 1845 – 8 December 1902) was a Dutch-born English Hebraist and librarian.

He emigrated to England in 1866, initially working as a teacher of French, German, and mathematics at Wilton College and St Andrew's College in Islington. He was appointed Hebrew librarian at the British Museum in 1873, following the deaths of Immanuel Deutsch and Joseph Zedner. In this role, he kept up serial publications and acquired important contemporary publications, including modern Hebrew and Yiddish belles-lettres.

Van Straalen translated many Dutch, German, and Hebrew books, including Louisa Stratenus's Gewroken (1892), and Alfred Hermann Fried's The Diary of a Condemned Man (1899). He is best known for his catalogue of the Hebrew books in the British Museum (London, 1894) supplementary to that by Joseph Zedner, with an index to both volumes. He also prepared a subject catalogue of the Hebrew collection, containing some 11,100 titles, which was left unpublished until 1991.

== Partial bibliography ==
- Stratenus, Louisa (1892). Suspected. Translated by Van Straalen, S. London: Chapman and Hall.
- Van Straalen, S. (1894). Catalogue of Hebrew books in the British Museum acquired during the years 1868–1892. London: British Museum. hdl:2027/nnc1.cu58806237.
- Fried, Alfred Hermann (1899). The Diary of a Condemned Man. Translated by Van Straalen, S. London: William Heinemann.
- Van Straalen, S. (1899). "Vorwort". Catalog der von Herrn Fischl Hirsch nachgelassenen Bücher und Handschriften (in English and German). Berlin: Druck von H. Itzkowski. hdl:2027/uiug.30112005650343.
- Van Straalen, S. (1991) [c. 1901]. Supplementary catalogue of Hebrew books in the British Museum, acquired during the years 1893–1899 (unpublished proofs). London: British Museum.
