= Joseph Saul Nathansohn =

Polish rabbi and posek

Joseph Saul Nathanson (1808–1875) (Hebrew: יוסף שאול בן אריה הלוי) was a Polish rabbi and posek, and a leading rabbinical authority of his day.

== Biography ==
Rabbi Nathanson was born at Berezhany (Berzan), Galicia (today's western Ukraine); he was the son of Aryeh Lebush Nathanson, rabbi at Berzan and author of "Bet El." He studied Talmud at Lviv (Lemberg) together with his brother-in-law Mordecai Zeeb Ettinger. In the 1830s in Lemberg—then under the rule of the Austrian Empire—he founded an informal study-group under his tutelage; this yeshiva attracted some of the most brilliant students in Galicia. In 1857 Nathanson was elected rabbi of Lemberg, where he officiated for eighteen years. He was a widely recognized rabbinical authority, and was asked to rule on various contemporary issues; his rulings are still widely cited (for instance he was one of the first to permit the use of machinery in baking Matzah, which created a widespread halachic controversy). Nathanson was very wealthy, and was known for his activity as a philanthropist. He died in Lemberg March 4, 1875, with no descendants.

== Works ==
Rabbi Nathanson was a voluminous writer, the author of many works, including:

- "Mefareshe ha-Yam" (Lemberg, 1828), in cooperation with his brother-in-law Mordecai Zeeb Ettinger: notes by Joshua Heschel on the "Yam ha-Talmud," to which they appended their own responsa - HebrewBooks.org
- "Me'irat 'Enayim" (Wilna, 1839), also together with Ettinger, on the ritual examination of the lungs - HebrewBooks.org
- "Magen Gibborim" (Lemberg, part i., 1832; part ii., 1837), also together with Ettinger, on Shulkhan Arukh, Orach Chayim - at HebrewBooks.org: I, II
- "Yad Yosef" and "Yad Sha'ul," on the Shulkhan Arukh, Yoreh De'ah (Lemberg, 1851) hebrewbooks.org
- "Ner Ma'arabi", on the Jerusalem Talmud
- "Haggahot ha-Shass", critical notes on the Talmud
- "Ma'ase Alfas", commentary on Isaac Alfasi
- "Sho'el u-Meshiv", responsa (his Magnum opus) (Lemberg, 1865–79) - at HebrewBooks.org: Kama, Tinyana, Telisa'ah, Revia'ah, Hamisha'ah, Shesisa'ah Mehadurat sheveuh was collected and reprinted by mechon harrai kedem
- "Dibre Sha'ul ve-Yosif Da'at", responsa (ib. 1879) - at HebrewBooks.org: Vol. I, Vol. II, Vols. I & II
- "Dibre Sha'ul", commentary on the Haggadah of Pesach Reprinted by Mechon Meoros Hatorah in year 2014- (Old version HebrewBooks.org)
- "Dibre Sha'ul", on the Pentateuch and the Five Scrolls - HebrewBooks.org was reprinted by mechon chachmas shlomo.
- "Dibre Sha'ul", on Aggadah - HebrewBooks.org
- "Bitul Moda'ah", in defense of machine Mazot - HebrewBooks.org
- "Yados Nedarim", on the laws of Nedarim - at HebrewBooks.org: link, link
- "Dibre Sha'ul / Edus Be'Yosef" - HebrewBooks.org

He also wrote glosses to many other works, and innumerable approbations to the books of others. His works are being reprinted by Mechon Harrai Kedem, Mechon Chachmas Shlomo and Mechon Meoros Hatorah.

== External links and references ==
- His entry in the Jewish Encyclopedia
- The “yeshiva world” of Eastern Europe, Berel Wein
- Memorial page to the bygone world of Berezhany Jews
- Shillem Warhaftig's Encyclopedia Judaica entry on Nathanson, at the Jewish Virtual Library

More can be seen in Hebrew in the front of Sefer Shoel Umeshiv reprinted by Mechon Harrai Kedem and haggada shel pesach Divrei Shaul reprinted by Mechon Meoros Hatorah.
