= David Solomon Eibenschutz =

Rabbi, Kabbalist, and author (b. 1755)

Harav (Rabbi) David Solomon Eibeschutz (Hebrew: דוד שלמה אייבשיץ) (alternate English spelling: David Shlomo Eibeschitz; Russian version: Ivshitz) was an 18th-century rabbi, Kabbalist and author. He was born in 1755 to a simple family most likely in the village of Jezierzany (Ukrainian: Ozeriany,Озеряни)in Ternopil Oblast, Ukraine (in Poland until 1939.)

There is some doubt as to his birthplace. There is an Ozeriany, Borshchiv Raion [Озеряни] (Борщівський район) and Ozeriany, Buchach Raion [Озеряни] (Бучацький район)and both are in Ternopil Oblast, Ukraine; it is unclear which of the two villages were his birthplace.

Nonetheless, the area’s acceptance of Jews was tentative. From 1717 to 1764, during the period when Rabbi Dovid Shlomo was born, a unit of infantry would be positioned in the town in the winter months; it was assumed that the fear of pogroms deterred Jews from settling in the town itself.

== Biography ==
Rabbi Dovid Shlomo’s father was a Russian rabbi named Yerachmiel.

The Soroker Rav Harav Meir Margolies of Ostroha (the Meir Nesivim) suggested Rabbi Dovid Shlomo as a fitting shidduch (marriage match) for the daughter of his close associate, Harav Yechiel Michel Seidman of Zlotshov.

Rabbi Dovid Shlomo’s grandfather-in-law was Harav Avraham Moshe Abusch [Circa 1690-1769; he served as rabbi of multiple communities, culminating with the position of head of the rabbinical court in Frankfurt.]

After his marriage, Robbi Dovid Shlomo learned Torah from 3 very learned men: his grandfather-in-law Harav Avraham Moshe Abusch (Abish), Harav Eliezer Auerbach and Harav Moshe Tzvi Heller/Meshullam Feivush Heller. [Rabbi Moses Tzvi Heller was the author of "Geon Tzvi".]

Rabbi Dovid Shlomo was drawn to Chassidus. Eventually, he would become a disciple of the leading talmidim of the Maggid of Mezeritch such as Rav Wolf of Tsherni-Ostrow and Rav Meshulam Feivish of Zborez.

Rabbi Dovid Shlomo’s first position was as Rosh Yeshivah (head of the religious school) in Nadvorna [southwest of Tarnopol/Ternopil, Ukraine] in 5540/1780, when he was 25. The following story is told of him while he was in Nadvorna in conjunction with the budding young Avraham Dovid, OBM, who would later become a great rabbi and president of the court in Buchach. (This material is taken from the book, Dor Deah, written by Yekutiel Kammelhar and published in Risha, Galicia.)

“The illustrious rabbi, our teacher, our rabbi, Dovid Shlomo Eibenschutz, of blessed memory, …was teaching Torah to the young Jews in Nadvorna at that time. He put him [young Avraham Dovid] to the test and commanded him to read several pages from some tractate. The lad read with such intelligence and great understanding that he [Rabbi Dovid Shlomo] was very amazed at the breadth of his knowledge and the sharpness of his intellect. Thus his reputation became known throughout the region. .. The years of childhood passed and when he [Avraham Dovid] became Bar Mitzvah, he also became one of the students of the head of community, our holy rabbi and teacher, the Magid, of blessed memory, from Nadvorna.”

After Nadvorna, Rabbi Dovid Shlomo became the first rabbi of the shtetl of Khorostov, Poland (now Khorostkiv, Ukraine). At this time, his 2 brothers came to live in Khorostkov, Poland and would remain after Rabbi David Shlomo would move to Budhanov.

In 5550/1790, at the age of 35, Rabbi Dovid Shlomo (who was known to be an inspiring preacher) became Rav in Budzhanov (which is now Budaniv, Ukraine), holding this post for about 11 years. Some of the drashas (sermons) he gave there are printed in Arvei Nachal, his best-known work, which remains in print. This work is in two parts, the first being a treatise on the Torah and, the second consisting of sermons (Kopust, Sudilkov, 1835; Krotoschin, 1840; Jitomir, 1850; Lemberg, 1856).

After Budaniv, Volhynia, he was named Rav of Soroki, Bessarabia, (now Soroca, Moldova) and is sometimes known as the Soroker Rav, although he is more commonly called the Arvei Nachal, after his best written work. The Jewish settlement in Soroka is first recorded in 1657, but its presence as an organized community dates to the 18th century when its 157 Jewish families were led by Rabbi Dovid Shlomo. The community would continue to grow after Rabbi Dovid Shlomo left there; by 1897, there were 8,763 Jews there.

At the same time, he was the Av Beit Din of Shyroke, a village in Sofiyivka Raion (district), Dnipropetrovsk Oblast (province), southern Ukraine.

After Soroka, Rabbi Dovid Shlomo served as rabbi in Jassy (now Iasi), Romania. From Iasi, he made aliyah (ascended to) the Land of Israel in 5569/1809. He settled in the holy city of Tzafed (Safed). In his vast humility, he davened at the back of the shul like a simple Jew and took a job as a melamed (teacher) there.

He authored many Talmudic and Kabbalistic works, some of which still exist in manuscript form. He wrote "Levushei Serad", in two parts. The first part contains a commentary on the Shulchan Aruch, "Orach Chayim", with comments on David ben Samuel’s "Turei Zahav" and Abraham Abele Gumbiner’s "Magen Avraham"; at the end of this part is added the plan of the Temple as described by Ezekiel (Mohilev, 1818, and frequently reprinted). The second part is on "Shulchan Aruch", "Yoreh De'ah" (Mohilev, 1812). His "Ne'ot Deshe" is a compilation of 138 responsa, in two parts, the first of which was published in Lemberg, 1861, while the second is in manuscript. "Arvei Nachal" is also in two parts, the first being a treatise on the Torah, the second consisting of sermons (Kopust, Sdilkov, 1835; Krotoschin, 1840; Jitomir, 1850; Lemberg, 1856).

Rabbi Dovid Shlomo Eibenshutz remained in Safed until his death on 22 Cheshvan 5574/15 November 1813. He is buried in the old Safed cemetery near Rav Isaac Luria. Rabbi Dovid Shlomo’s ohel (grave) is in a cave alongside Rabbi Avroham Dov of Avoritch. Also buried in this cave are Rabbi Aryeh Yehudah Leib of Volochisk and his son and daughter in law who was the daughter of Rabbi Nachman of Breslov.

Rabbi Levi Yitzchak of Berdychiv (Rabbi Dovid Shlomo’s relative of an unknown connection), writes about Rabbi Dovid Shlomo in his approbation to Rabbi Dovid Shlomo’s "Arvey Nachal" that Rabbi Dovid Shlomo was, "Proficient in all areas of Torah learning and all his deeds are for the sake of Heaven".

== Jewish Encyclopedia bibliography ==
- Eliezer Kohn, Kin'at Soferim, p. 90;
- Fuenn, Ḳiryah Ne'emanah, p. 223;
- Benjacob, Oẓar ha-Sefarim, pp. 255, 391, 449.
